= Dol-Mandir =

Hindu temple in Bangladesh

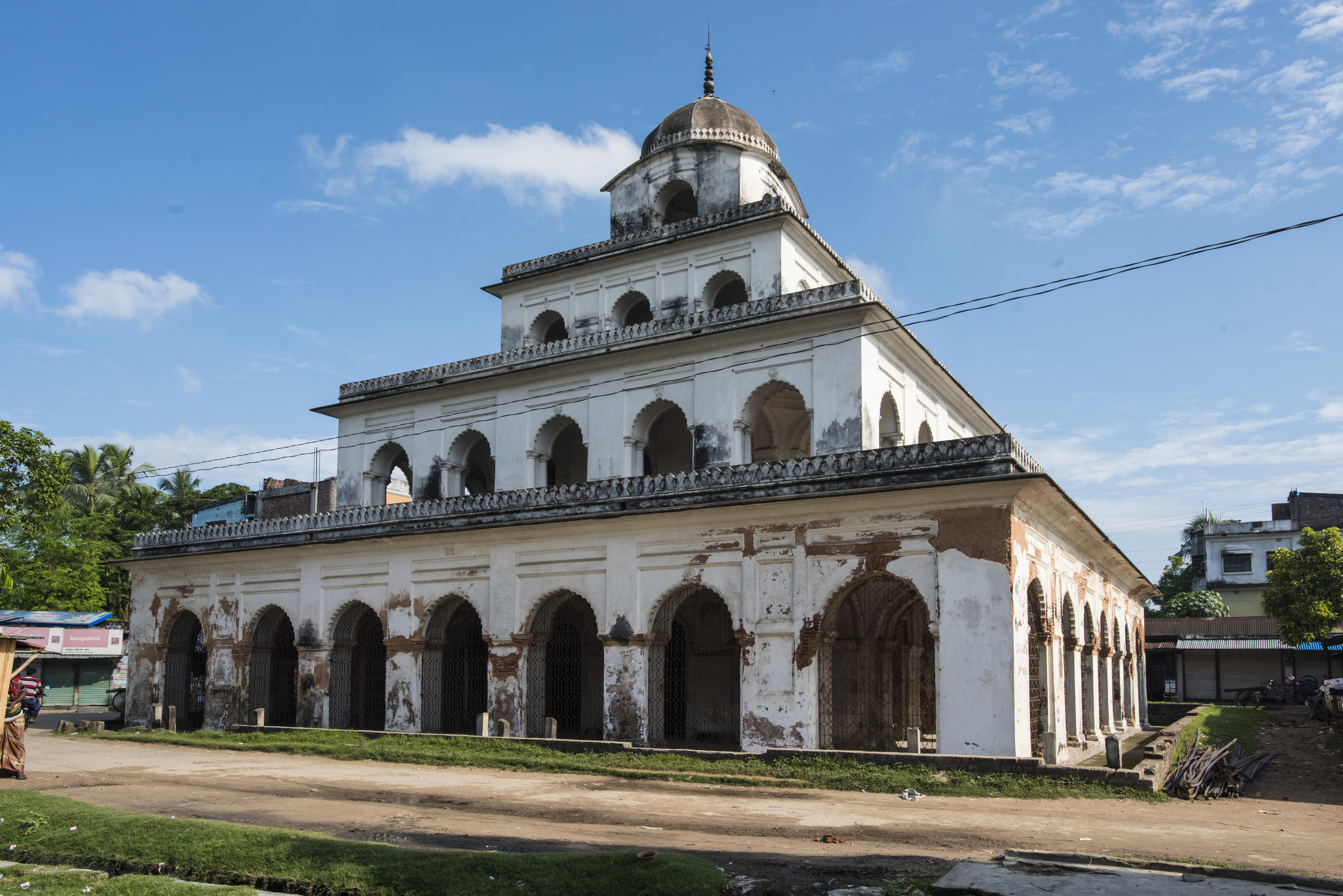
The four tiers of the Dol Temple

Dol-Mandir, also known as Dol-Mandav, is a Hindu temple of the Puthia Temple Complex in Puthia Upazila, Rajshahi Division, Bangladesh. It is located within the Puthia market area. An inscription dates the temple to 1778 built by Vubanendra Narayan, the Panch Ani Raja.

The temple is in Puthia town which is 32 kilometres (20 mi) away by road from Rajshahi city; the city is also a rail head and is on the Dhaka Rajashahi Highway.

== Features ==
The temple is built to a square plan, each side measuring 69.75 feet (21.26 m). It is a four storied edifice built in brick masonry. At each successive floor the size gets proportionally reduced with the top floor built to square plan, similar to the Panch Mahal in Fatehpur Sikri or Mandvi in Baroda, India. Each of the four floors of the temple has a facade made of a series of arches. The top floor square chamber is crowned with a ribbed dome which is fitted with a spire or kalasha. The surfaces of external and internal walls are simply plastered.

== See also ==
- List of archaeological sites in Bangladesh
