= Chota Anhik Mandir =

Hindu temple in Bangladesh

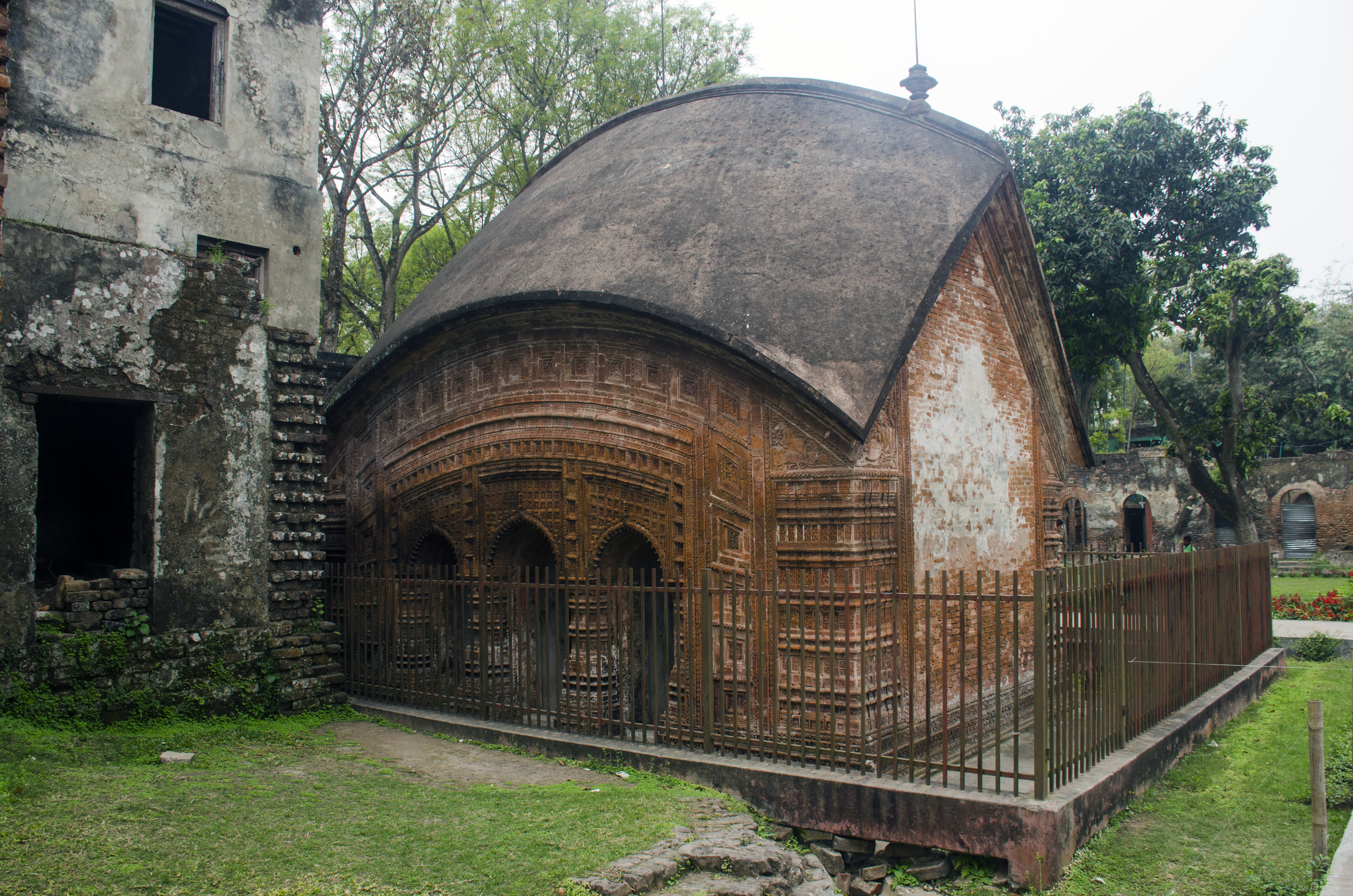

- Location within Bangladesh

Religion
- Affiliation: Hinduism

Location
- Location: Puthia
- State: Rajshahi
- Country: Bangladesh
- Interactive map of Chota Anhik Mandir
- Coordinates: 24.332°N 88.861°E

Architecture
- Creator: Prem Narayan Roy

Chota Anhik Mandir (Bengali: ছোট আহ্নিক মন্দির) is a Hindu temple of the Puthia Temple Complex in Puthia Upazila, Rajshahi Division, Bangladesh.

== Location ==
Puthia town where the temple is located is accessible by road, 32 km away from Rajshahi town which is also a railhead. Rajshahi is located on the Dhaka Rajashahi Highway. It is located behind the Puthia Rajbari.

== Architecture ==
It is a small temple following the do chala style of Bengal temple architecture. The front facade has a triple arch entrance complete with intricate terracotta ornamentation.

== Gallery ==
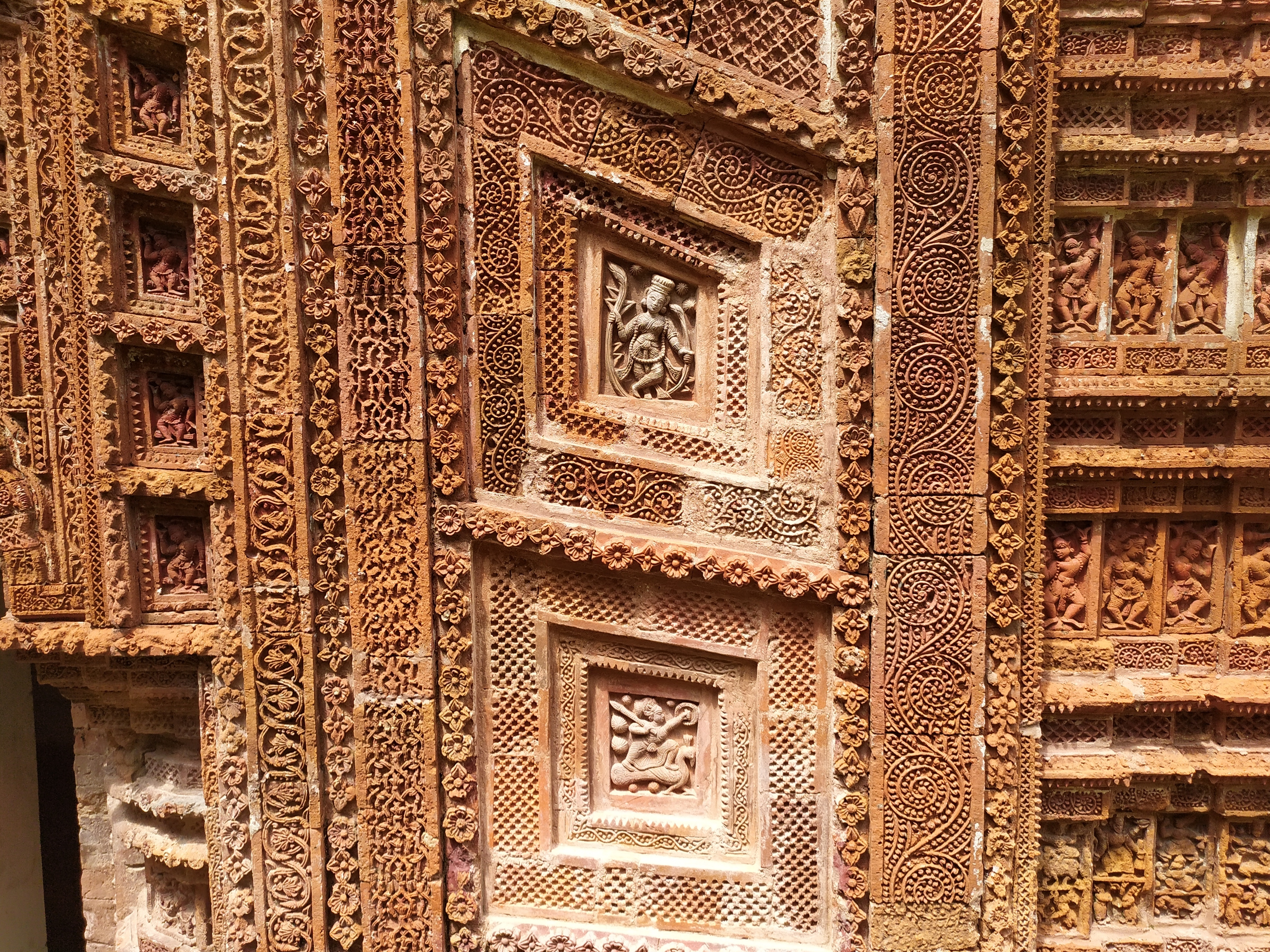
Terracotta on the wall

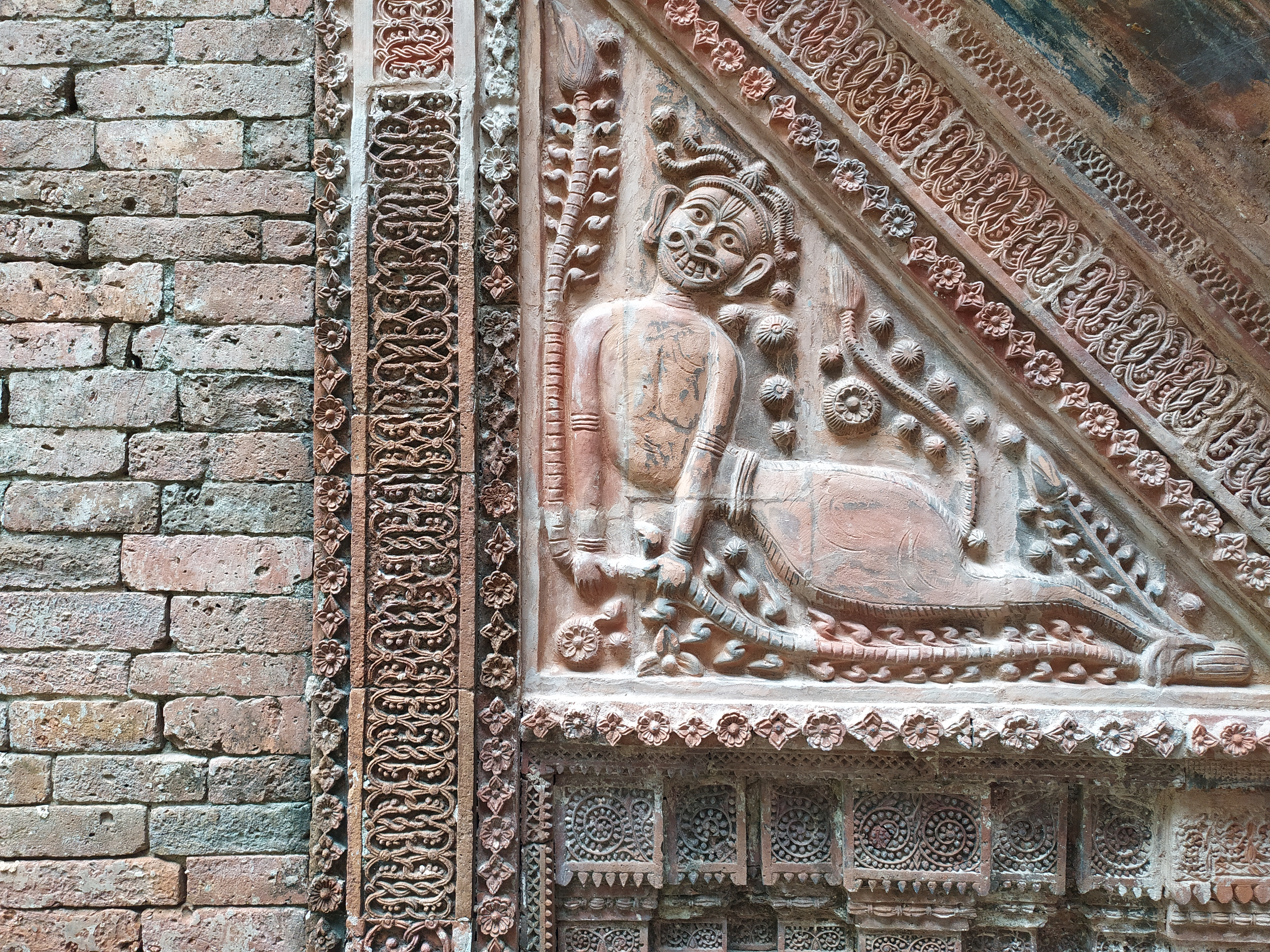
Terracotta on the wall

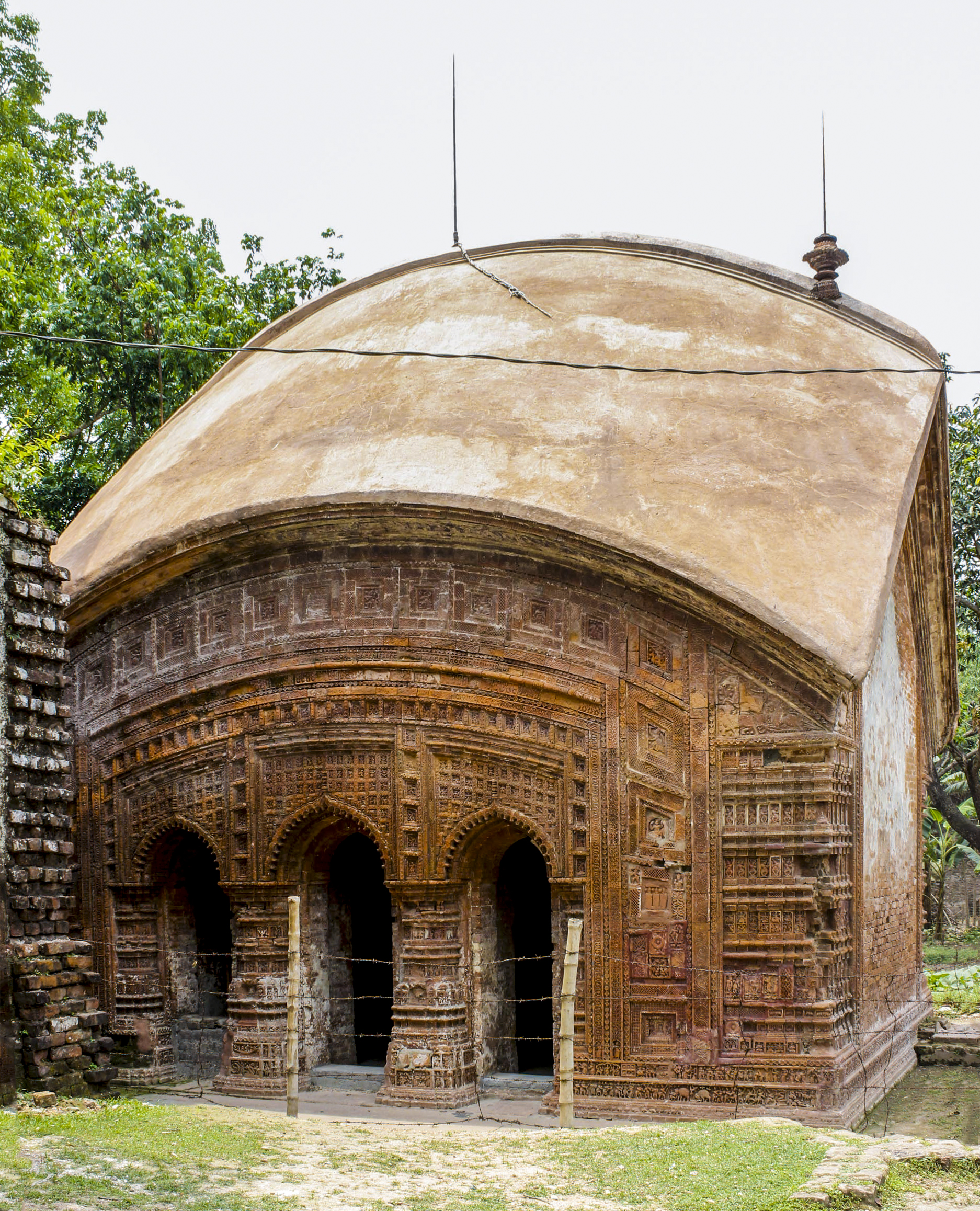
Choto Annik Mandir
