= Pancha Ratna Shiva Temple =

Hindu temple in Bangladesh

Coordinates: 24.3638°N 88.8371°E

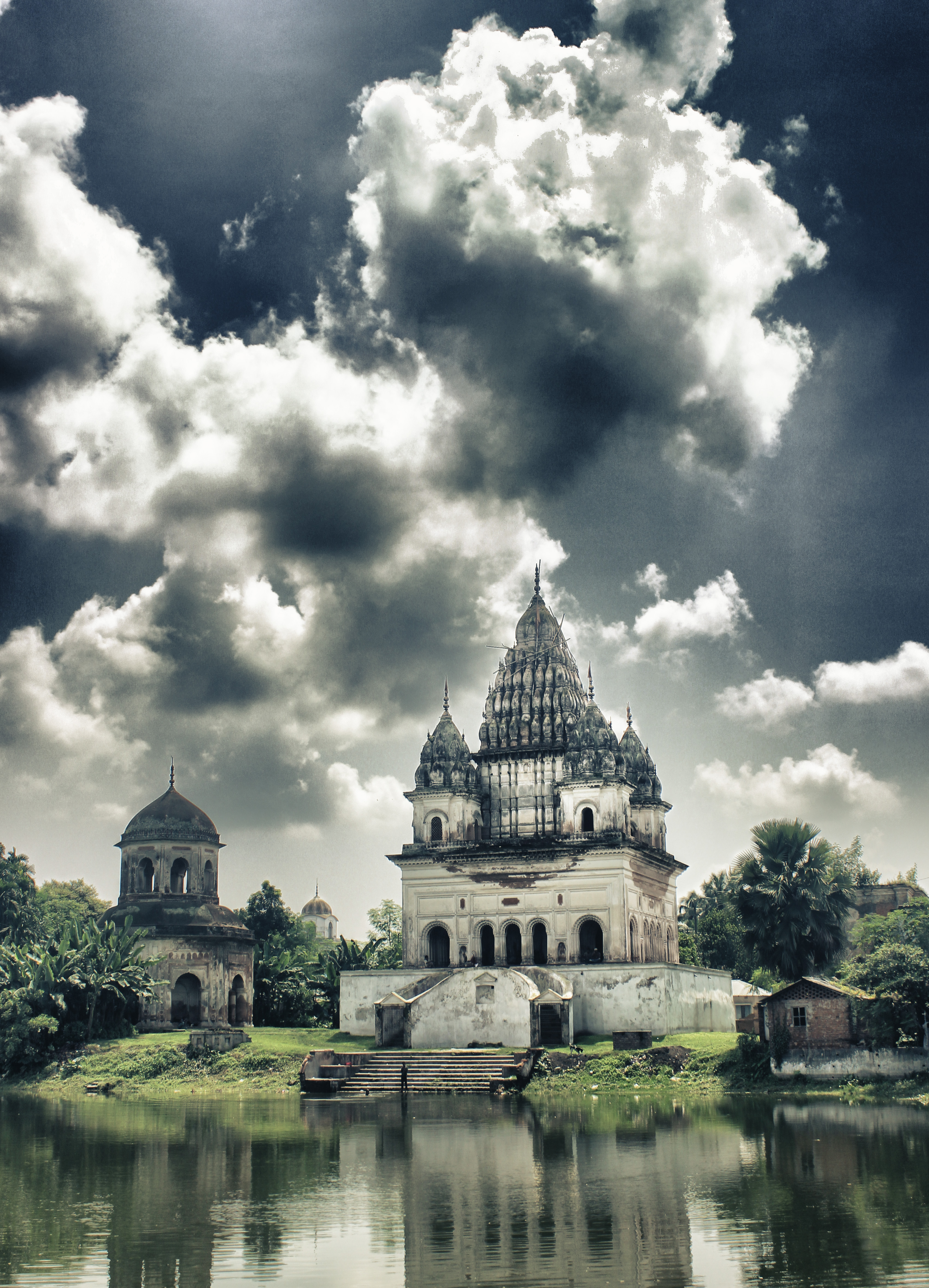
Pancha Ratna Shiva Temple

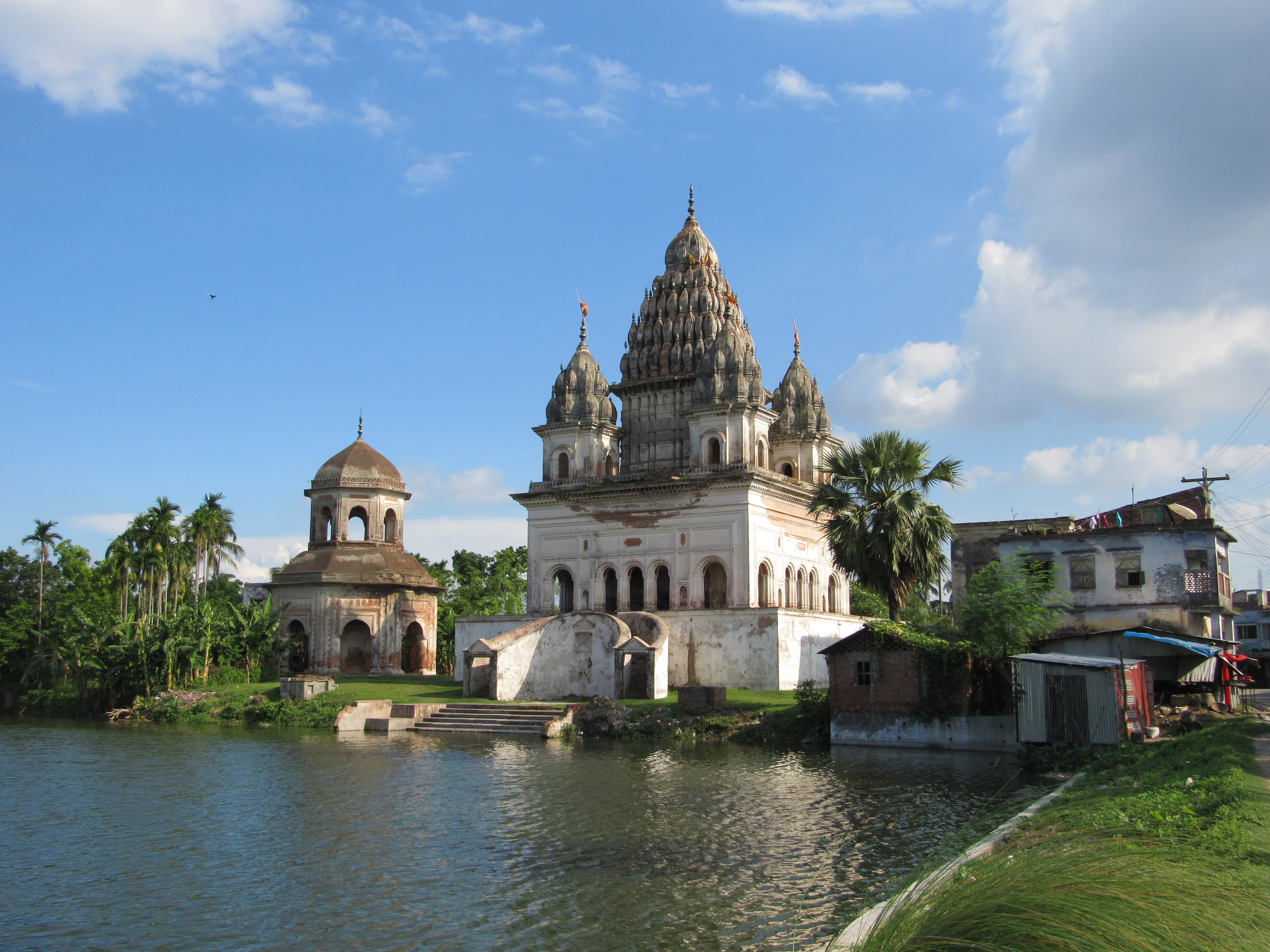
The Shiva Temple at Puthia over the Shiv Sagar lake. The Roth temple is on the left.

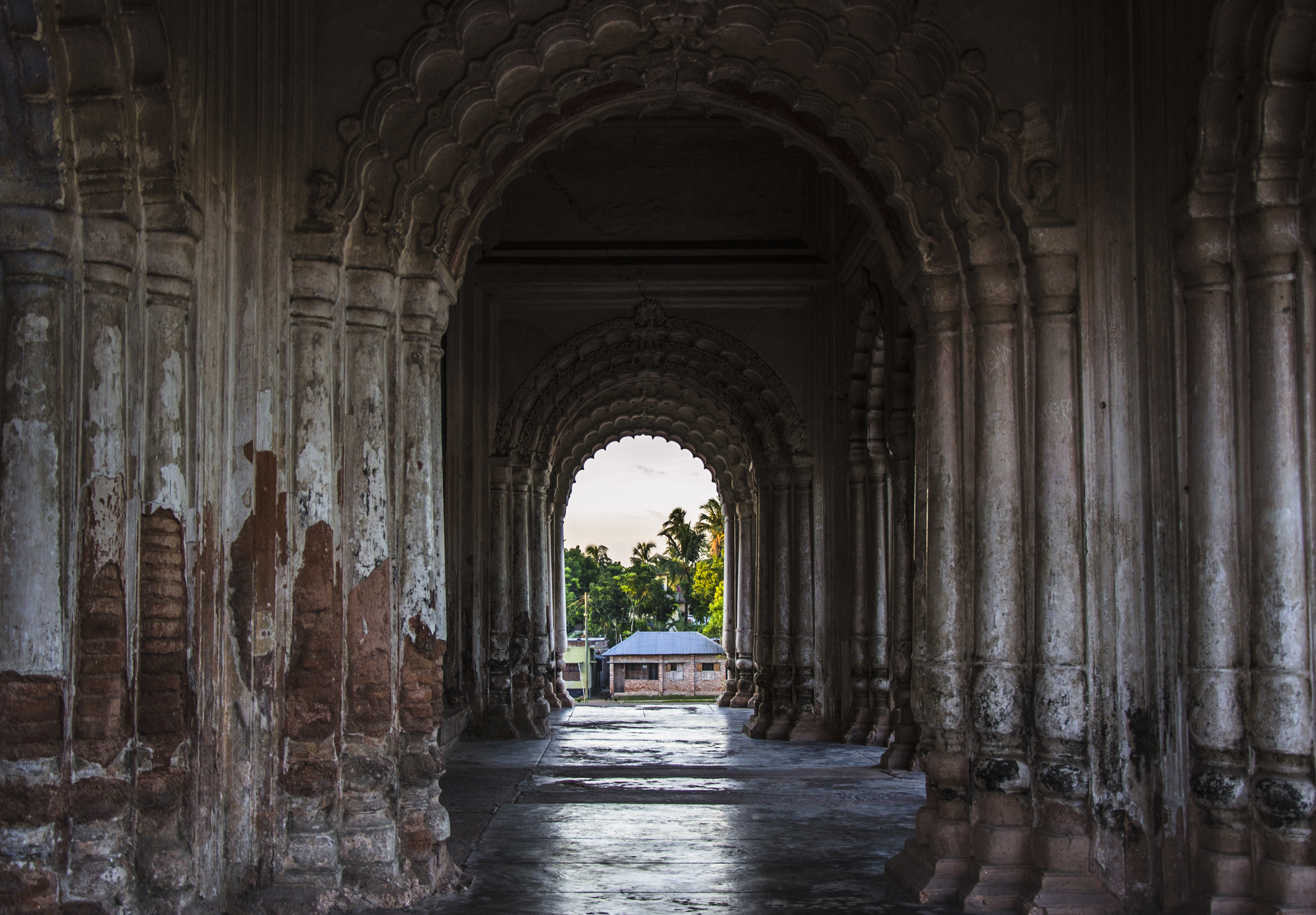
An inside view of the temple

Pancha Ratna Shiva Temple, also known as Bhubaneswar Shiva Mandir, is a Hindu temple of the Puthia Temple Complex in Puthia Upazila, Rajshahi Division, Bangladesh. It is the largest Shiva temple in Bangladesh. The shrine overlooks the Shiv Sagar (Shiva's lake) to its left. The temple is well decorated in pancharatna (five spires) architectural style and is located at the entrance of the Puthia Rajbari. Among the surviving Hindu temples, this shrine is said to be "an exceptional and more attractive for its architectural beauty" in Bangladesh.

The temple is in Puthia town which is 32 kilometres (20 mi) away by road from Rajshahi city; the city is also a rail head and is on the Dhaka-Rajashahi Highway.

== History ==
The temple's construction is attributed to Rani Bhuban Mayi Devi, the widow of Raja Jagat Narayan Ray of the five-anna estate. It was built between 1823 and 1830 at an estimated cost of three million taka.

== Features ==
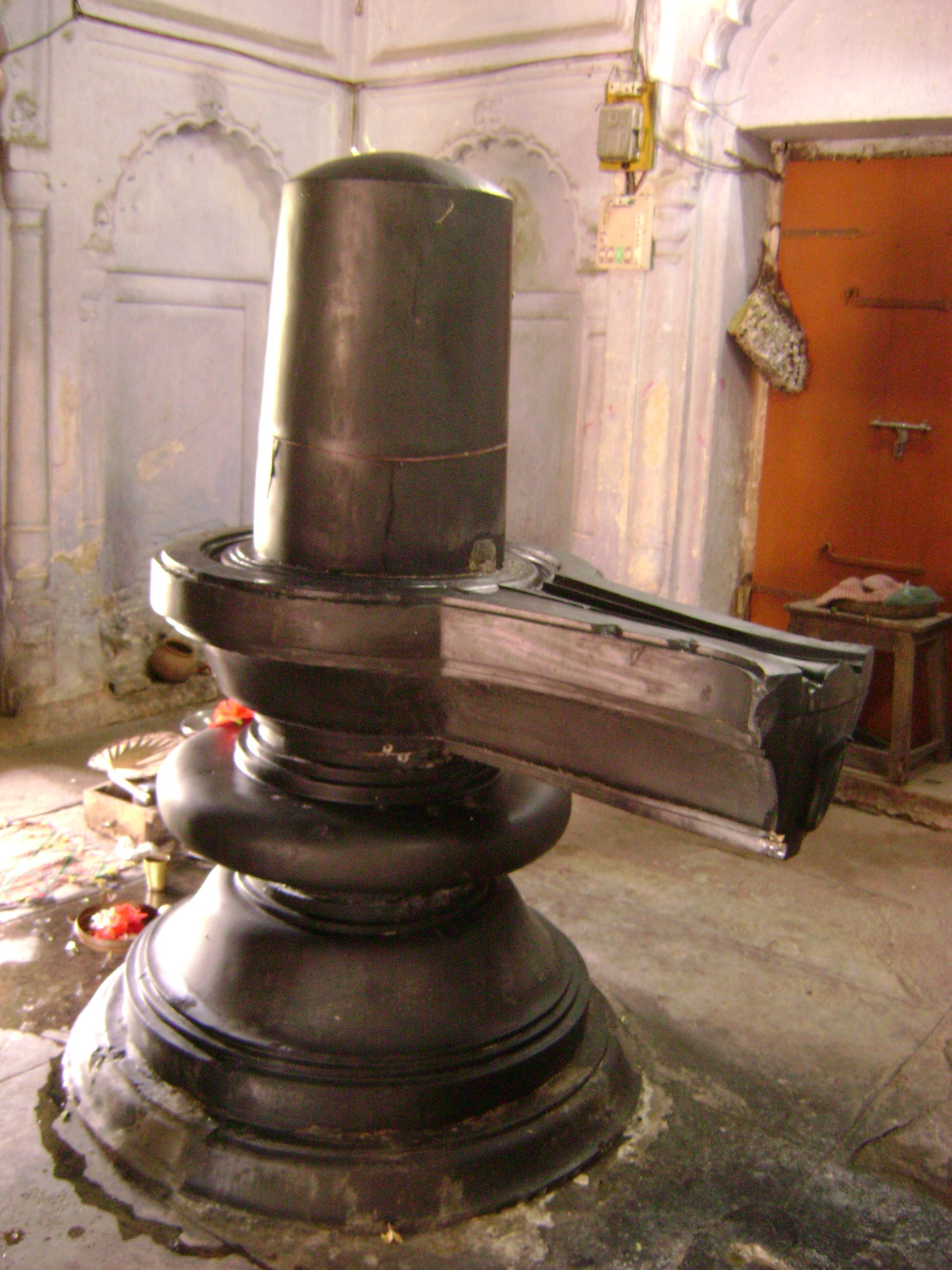
A Shiva Linga in the sanctum sanctorum of the temple

It is a brick temple with a plaster finish and no terracotta ornamentation. It follows the Pancha Ratna (five pinnacle) style of temple architecture. Each of the five pinnacles are composed of several smaller pinnacles. It is built over a raised platform of 11.66 feet (3.55 m) height, and its towers have beehive type design. Built in brick masonry, in plan it is 65 feet (20 m) square, with "north Indian type turrets and plastered finish". The central sanctum is the only chamber of the temple which is 13.25 feet (4.04 m) square. A Shiva Linga, carved from black basalt stone is deified in the sanctum; it is the largest in the country. The central chamber is enclosed within a passage that runs on all four sides. The passage has cusp arched entrances from four sides. The temple tower consists of five decorated spires. The internal and external plastered walls of the temple are decorated with panels with themes from Hindu mythology. The raised platform of the temple is accessed through two brick built stairways, one from the north and the other from the southern direction.

It is decorated with stone carvings and sculptural works, which were disfigured during the Bangladesh Liberation War in 1971. The invading Pakistani army attempted to displace and break the Shiva Linga, but were unable to move it from its position. The temple is now a protected monument.

The corridors have a touch of Jaipuri architecture.

== See also ==
- List of archaeological sites in Bangladesh
