= Pancha Ratna Govinda Temple =

Hindu temple in Bangladesh

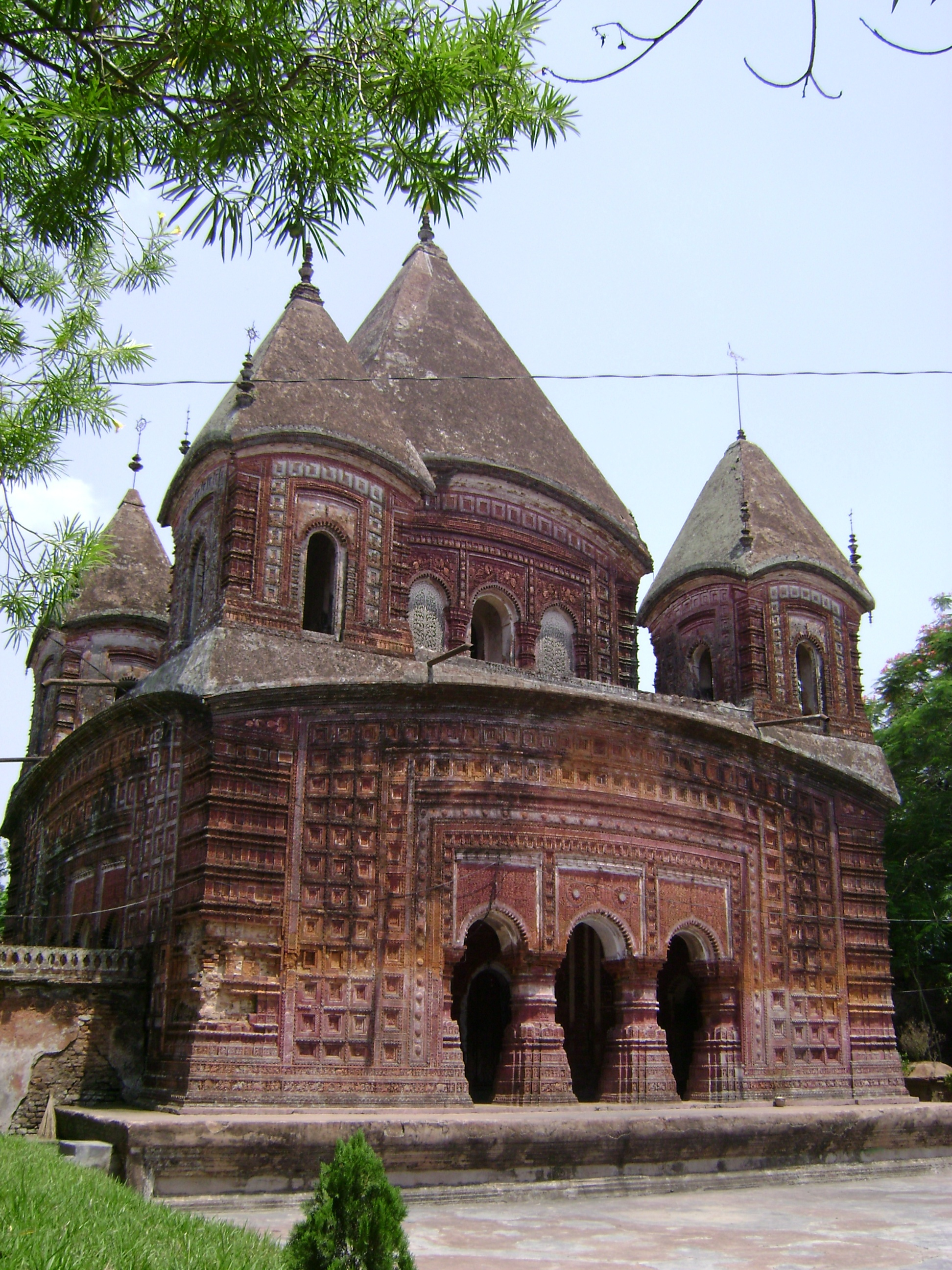
- Pancha Ratna Govinda Temple in Rajshahi, Bangladesh

Religion
- Affiliation: Hinduism

Location
- Location: Puthia, Rajshahi
- Country: Bangladesh

Architecture
- Completed: Between 1823 and 1895

The Pancha Ratna Govinda Temple (Bengali: পঞ্চরত্ন গোবিন্দ মন্দির) in Puthia village, Rajshahi district in Bangladesh. The temple is a striking monument, which was built in the 19th century. It has the architectural feature of five ratnas or spires. It is located within the inner precincts of the Puthia Rajbari or palace.

== Location ==
The temple is in Puthia town which is 32 kilometres (20 mi) away by road from Rajshahi city; the city is also a rail head and is on the Dhaka Rajashahi Highway.

== History ==
The temple, located in the inner precincts of the Rajbari, to the left of Govindabari or Mandirangan of Panch Ani palace, is reported to have been built between 1823 and 1895. It was built by one of the maharani (queens) of the Puthia Royal family.

== Features ==
The temple is large square edifice with five decorated ratnas or spires. The feature in the lower portion of the spires consists of ridges while the upper part is tapered upward. It is built in brick masonry over a raised platform. The temple's interior has a square sanctum sanctorum (garbagriha), with four square chambers in the corners, narrow passages on all four sides and has cusped arched openings. The roof of the sanctum and the chambers is formed by semi-circular domes, while the roof over the passages is vaulted. It has simple surface plastering but with fine detailing with red coloured terracotta patterns on all four outer walls. It is said that the temple architecture was inspired by the Kantanaga Temple built about 100 years earlier. The terracotta designs are made in panels which have depiction of romantic scenes from the Hindu epics of Ramayana and Radha-Krishna episodes related to Krishna and Radha. The sanctum in the temple has a Krishna image which is worshipped by local Hindus.

== Gallery ==
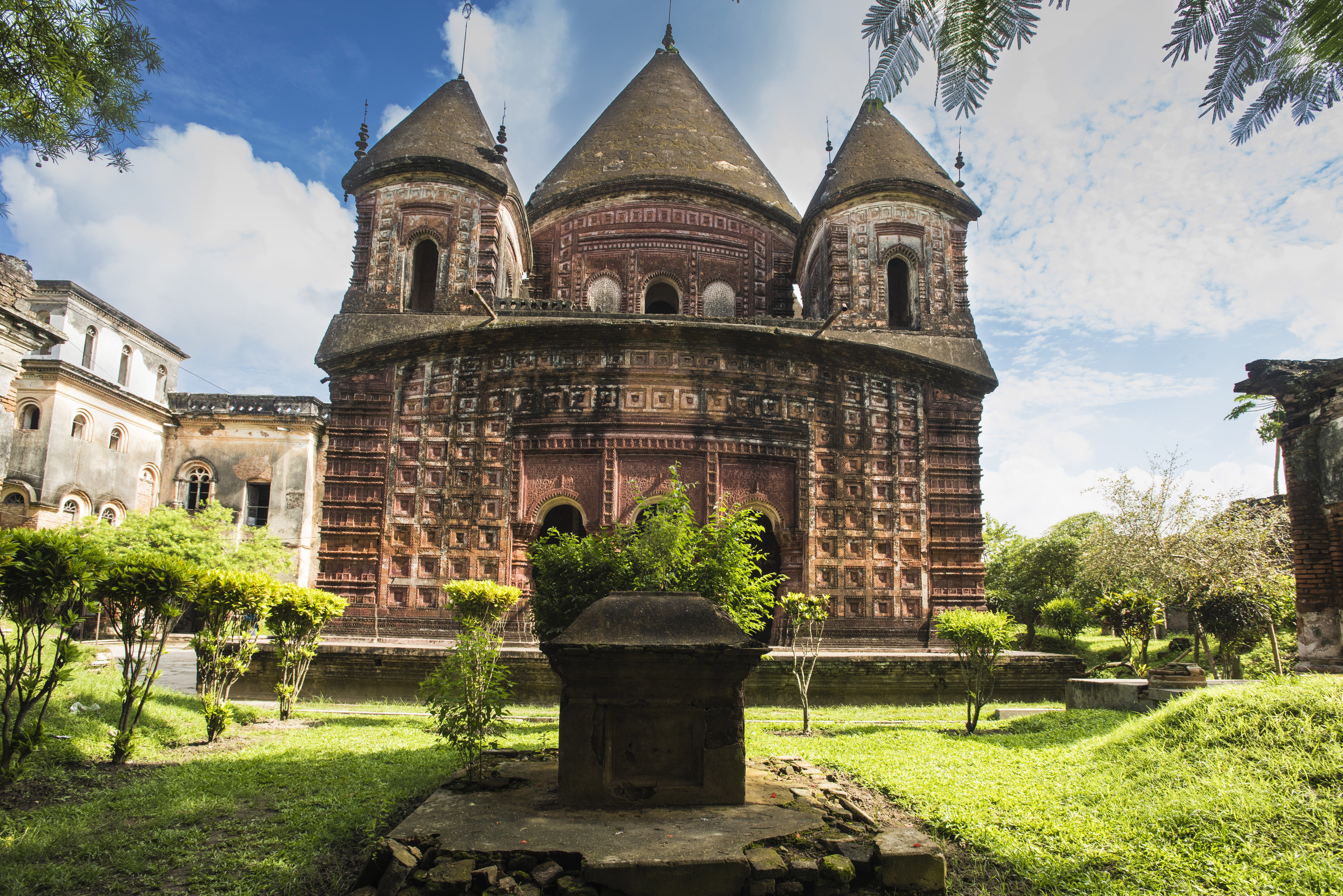
Pancharatna Gobinda Temple

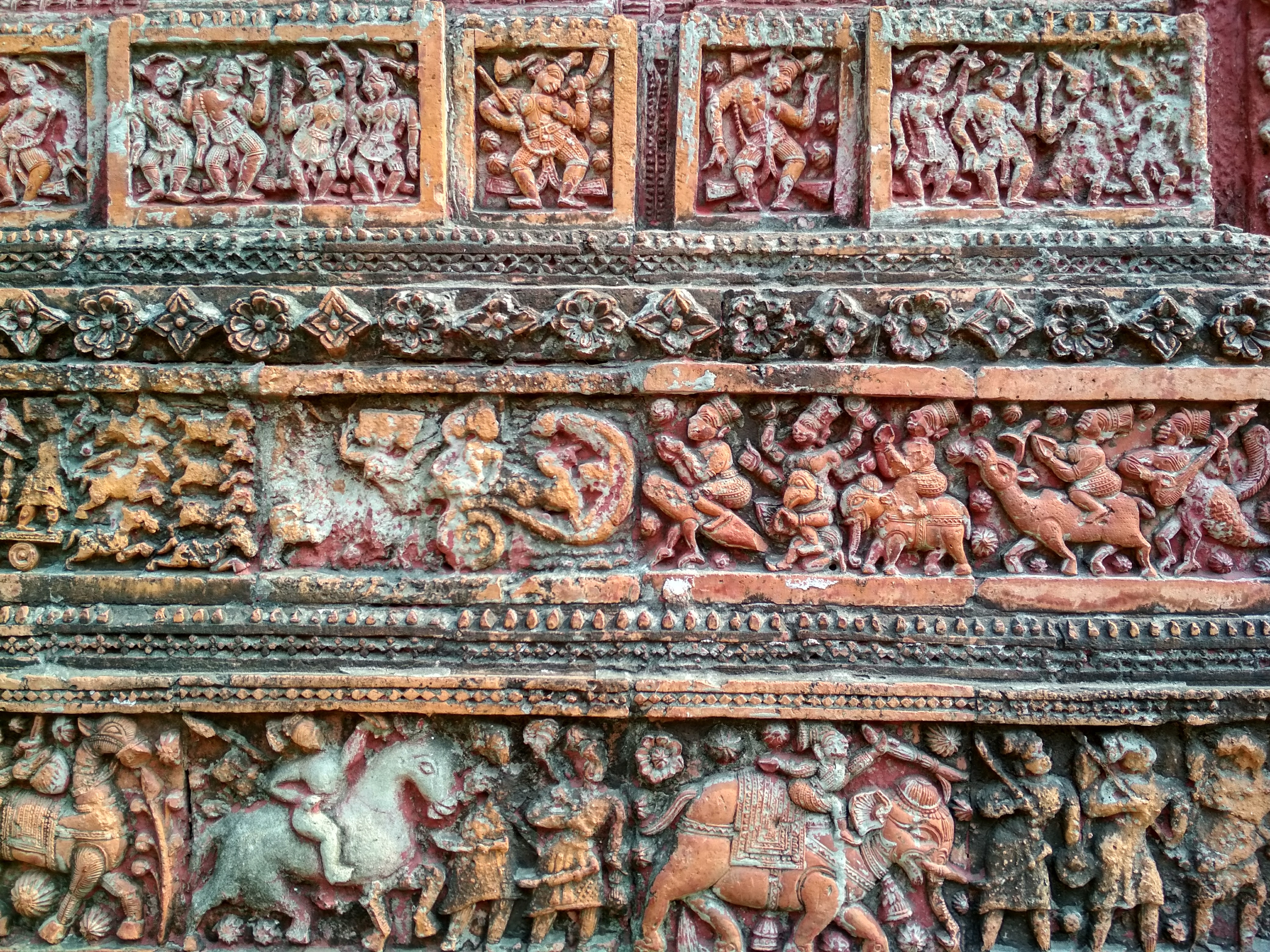
Terracotta of the Temple

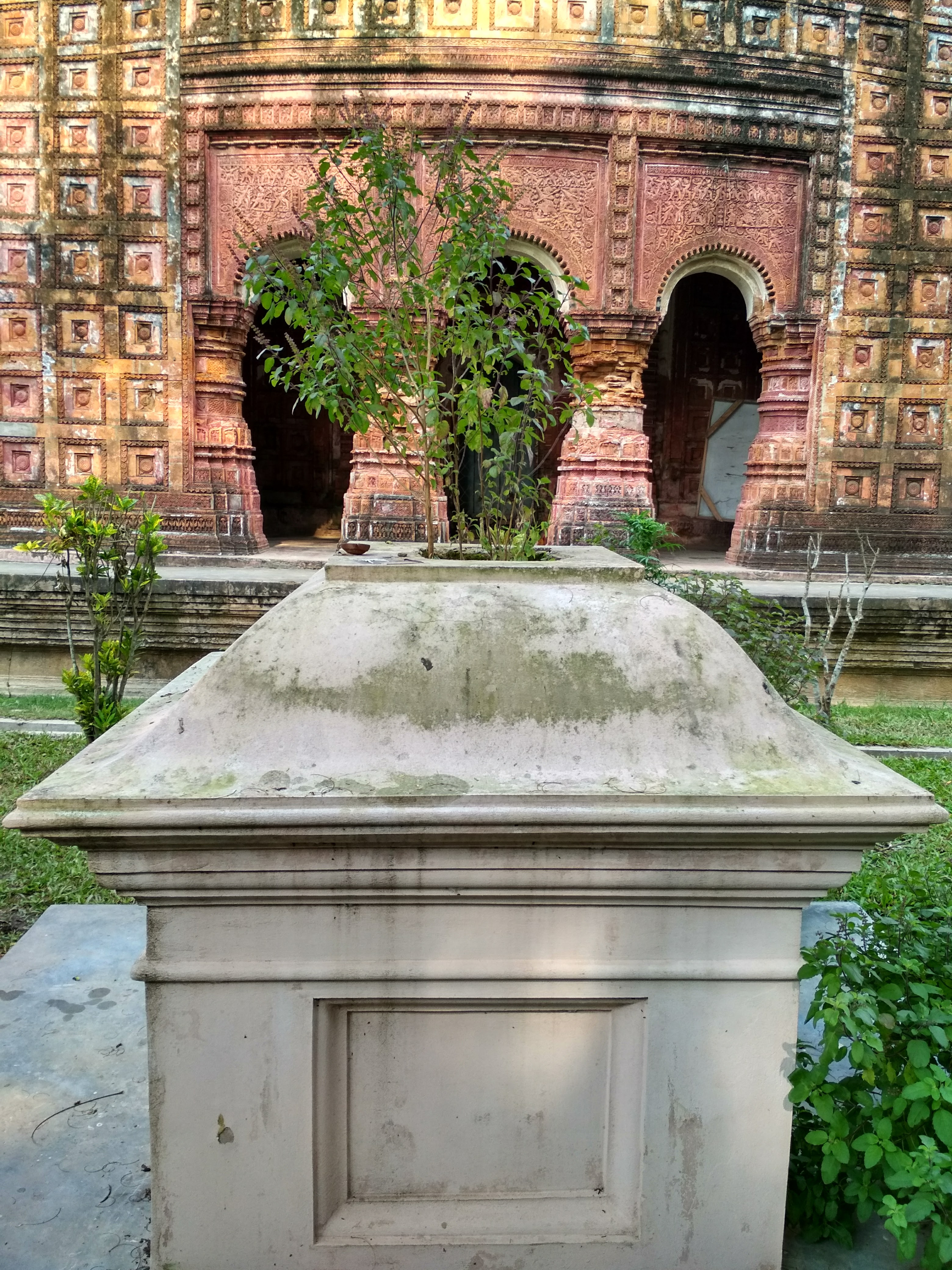
Mint-tree in the yard

== See also ==
- List of archaeological sites in Bangladesh
