= Puthia Temple Complex =

Cluster of notable old Hindu temples in Bangladesh

Coordinates: 24.3681°N 88.8667°E

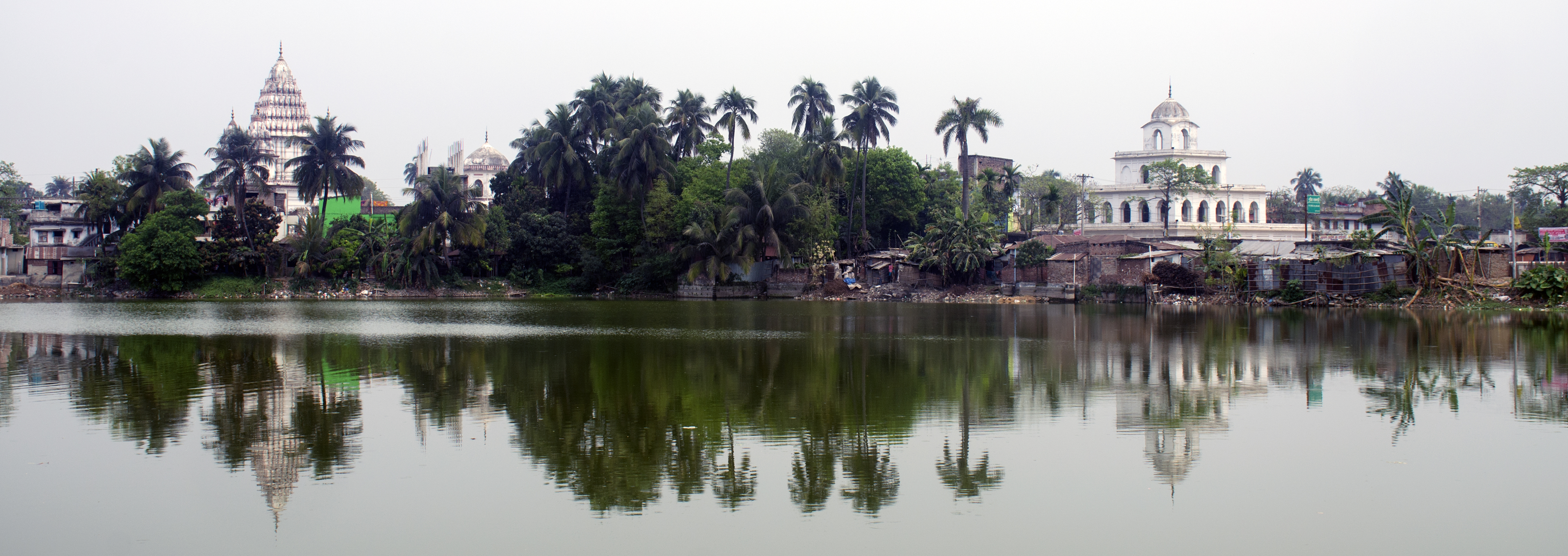
Panoramic view of Puthia Temple Complex 1

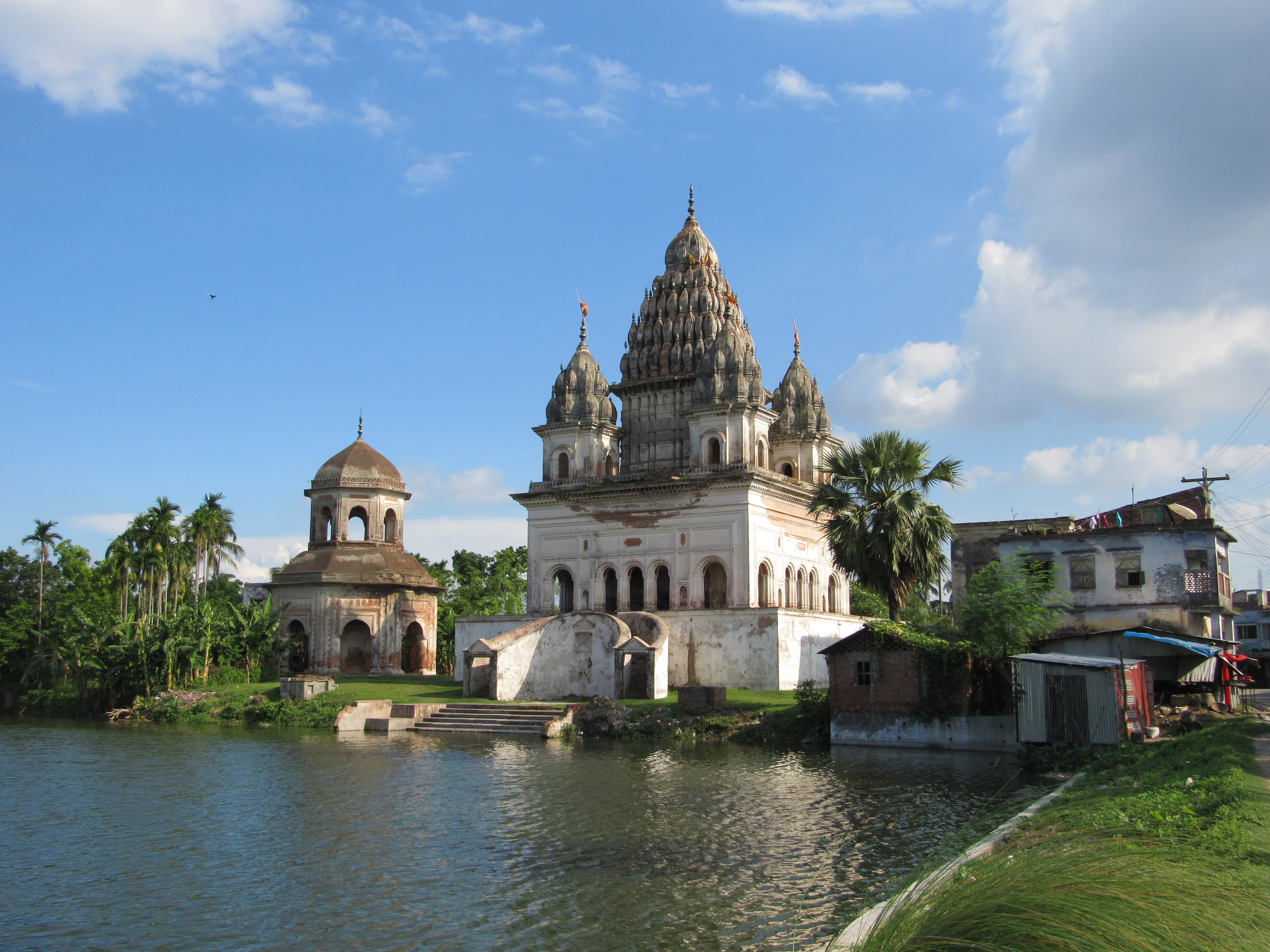
The Shiva Temple at Puthia over the Shiv Sagar lake. The Roth temple is on the left.

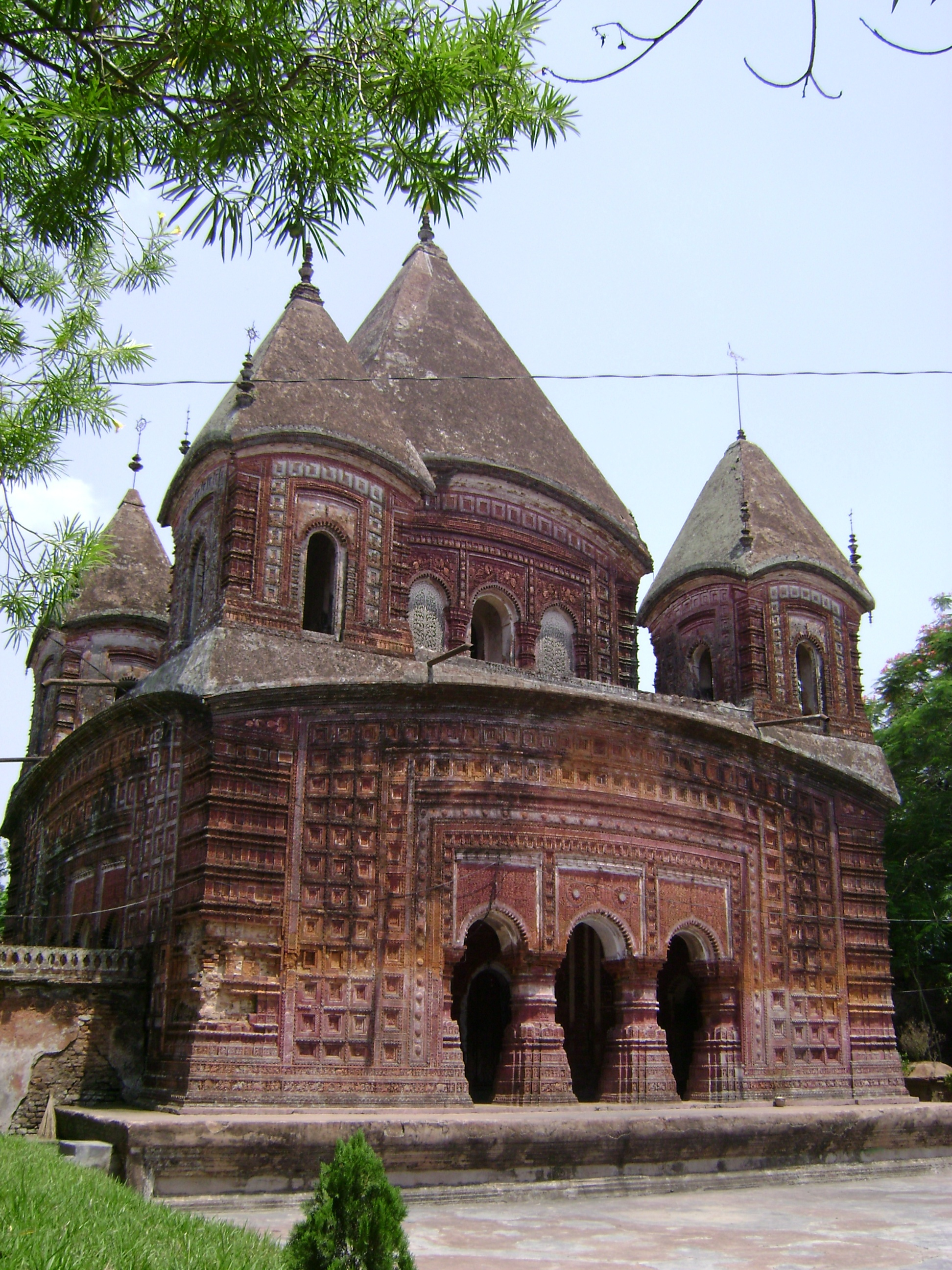
Pancha Ratna Govinda Temple

The Puthia Temple Complex consists of a cluster of notable old Hindu temples in Puthia Upazila, Rajshahi District, Bangladesh. Located 23 km to the east of Rajshahi city, it has the largest number of historic temples in Bangladesh. The temples were built by Hindu Zamindars Rajas of the Puthia Raj family who were noted philanthropists of Rajshahi. The temples have been built in terracotta in a variety of styles combining the typical Jor-bangla Style architecture with other influences. The Rajbari or Palace of the Raja of Puthia and the Dol Mancha are part of the complex. The temples are laid out around a lake named Shyam Sagar and the complex is surrounded by a moat called Shiv Sagar.

The Puthia Raj family was established by a holy man named Bhatsacharya, who lived in the 16th century. Raja Man Singh, governor of the Mughal emperor Akbar, confiscated the Jagir of the refractory pathan jagirdar of Rajshahi named Lashker Khan and bestowed the Zamindary on the saintly Bhatsacharya for his learning, but he declined. However, his son Pitambar was granted the Lashkarpur estate permanently. On his death, his son Nilambar received the title of Raja from Emperor Jahangir. The Puthia Royal Family estate was the second largest zamindary and the wealthiest in British Bengal. After India's partition, the then Pakistani government abolished the zamindary system and confiscated all Hindu properties. The Royal Family migrated to India shortly afterward.

== Pancha Ratna Govinda Temple ==
This grand temple of Puthia, the Pancha Ratna Govinda Temple was erected in mid-nineteenth century by the queen of Puthia. It is also known as the Boro Govindo Mandir. The temple follows the Pancha Ratna) style of architecture. The temple is dedicated to Lord Krishna, as the Puthia royal family were converted to Vaishnavism by Radhamohana Thakura. The temple has exquisite terracotta ornamentation depicting the divine romance between Krishna and Radha. The temple's survival is threatened by the newly established college nearby and the lack of conservation efforts.the temple was erected in between 1823 and 1895.

== Bhubaneshwar Shiva Temple ==
The Bhubaneshwar Shiva Temple or the Boro Shiv Mandir or the Pancha Ratna Shiv Mandir is the largest Shiva temple in Bangladesh. Built in 1823 by Rani Bhubonmoyee Devi, the widow of Raja Jagat Narayan Roy, it overlooks the Shiv Sagar lake. This ornate temple is an imposing and excellent example of the five spire style (Pancha Ratna)) temple architecture common in eastern India. Each of the five pinnacles consists of several sub pinacles. Each of the corner pinnacles are composed of 17 smaller pinnacles, while the larger central pinnacle has a total of 108 sub-pinnacles. The corridors have a touch of Jaipuri architecture and in the sanctuary, lies a very large black basalt Shiva Linga, the largest in the country. It is decorated with stone carvings and sculptural works, which were disfigured during the Bangladesh Liberation War in 1971. The invading Pakistani army attempted to displace and break the Shiva Linga, but were unable to move it from its position. The temple is now a protected monument.

== Jagannath Temple ==
The Jagannath Temple (also known as the Rath Mandir) is dedicated to the Hindu God Jagannath, a form of Krishna. It is located next to the Bhubaneshwar Shiva Temple. It is a two-storied octagonal structure.

== Chota Anhik Mandir ==
Chota Anhik Mandir is a small Hindu temple in the Puthia Temple Complex. It follows the do chala style and is located near the Pancharatna Govinda Temple.

== Chauchala Chhota Govinda Mandir ==
Chauchala Chhota Govinda Mandir also known as the Choto Govindo Mandir is a Hindu temple in the Puthia complex. It follows the Char Chala style of architecture. The temple is believed to date to the 1790s-1800s period. The southern frontage is extensively decorated with terracotta plaques, which depict ten incarnations Avatars of Vishnu, Lankakanda a chapter in the epic Ramayana legend, Radha-Krishna epic stories, flower designs and geometric art and scenes of the civic life of the period.

== Bara Anhik Mandir ==
Bara Anhik Mandir (Big Anhik Temple) is a Hindu temple of the Puthia Temple Complex. It stands next to Chauchala Chhota Govinda Mandir on the west side of the complex and faces east. It was built by the Rajas of Puthia. It follows a mixed form of Bengal temple architecture with a central do chala flanked with two char chala structures on both sides. The only other temple in Bangladesh following similar architecture is the Rajaram Mandir in Faridpur District.

== Choto Shiv Mandir ==
This small shiv temple is located behind the Puthia Rajbari. It is a small temple following the Char Chala style of architecture. THe front face have intricate terracotta ornamentation.

== Gallery ==
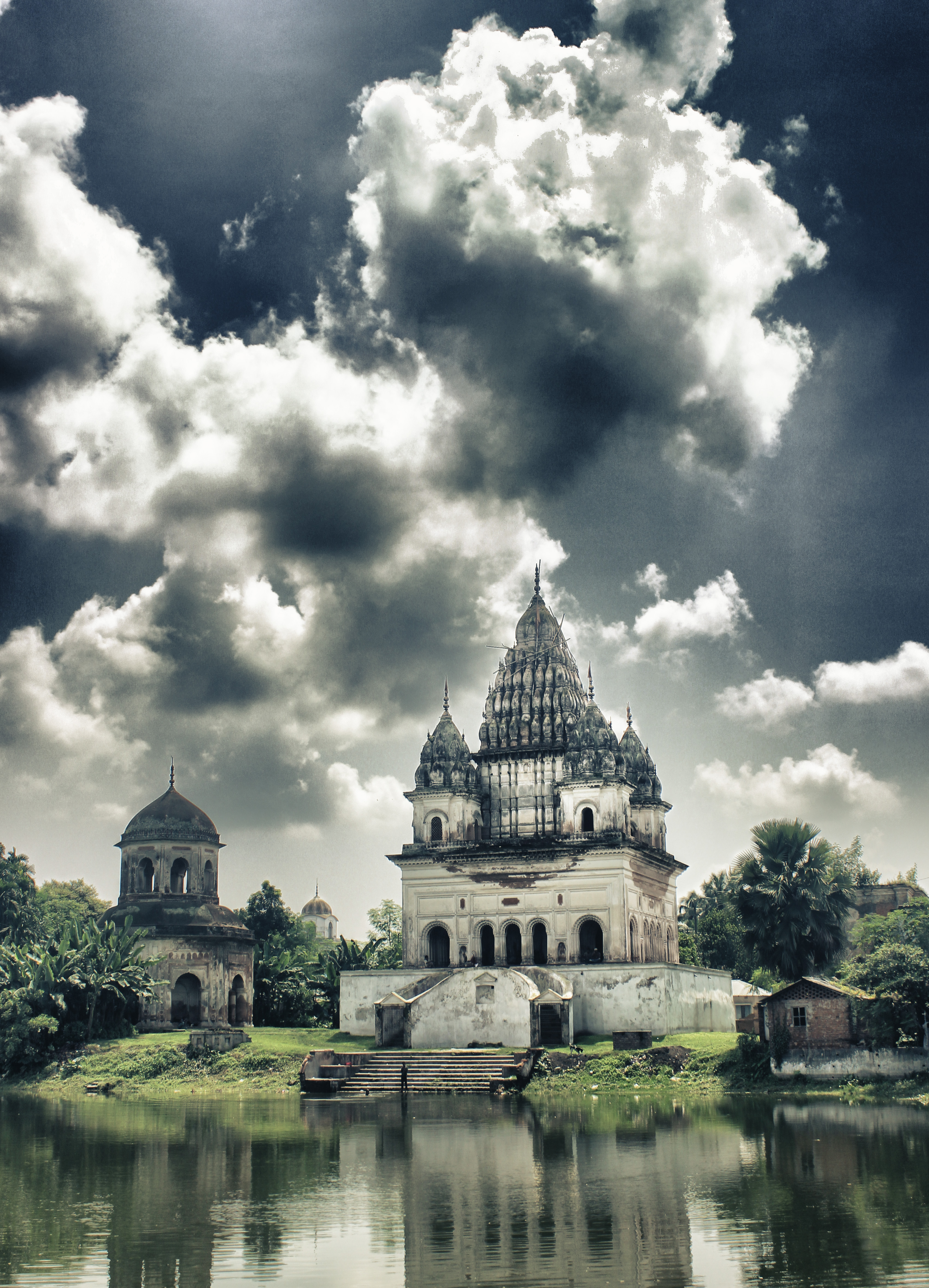
The Shiva Temple

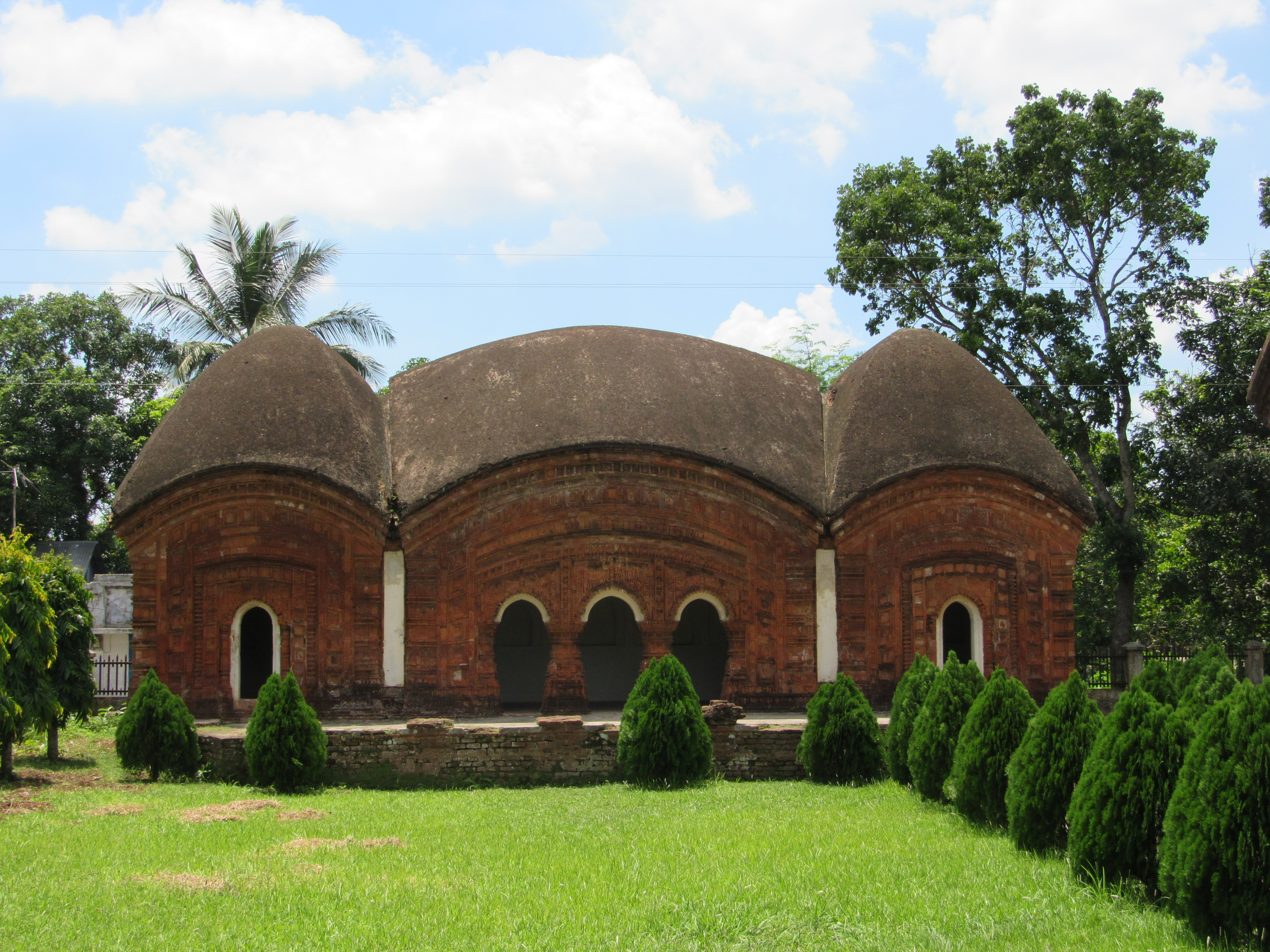
Bara Ahnik Mandir at Puthia.

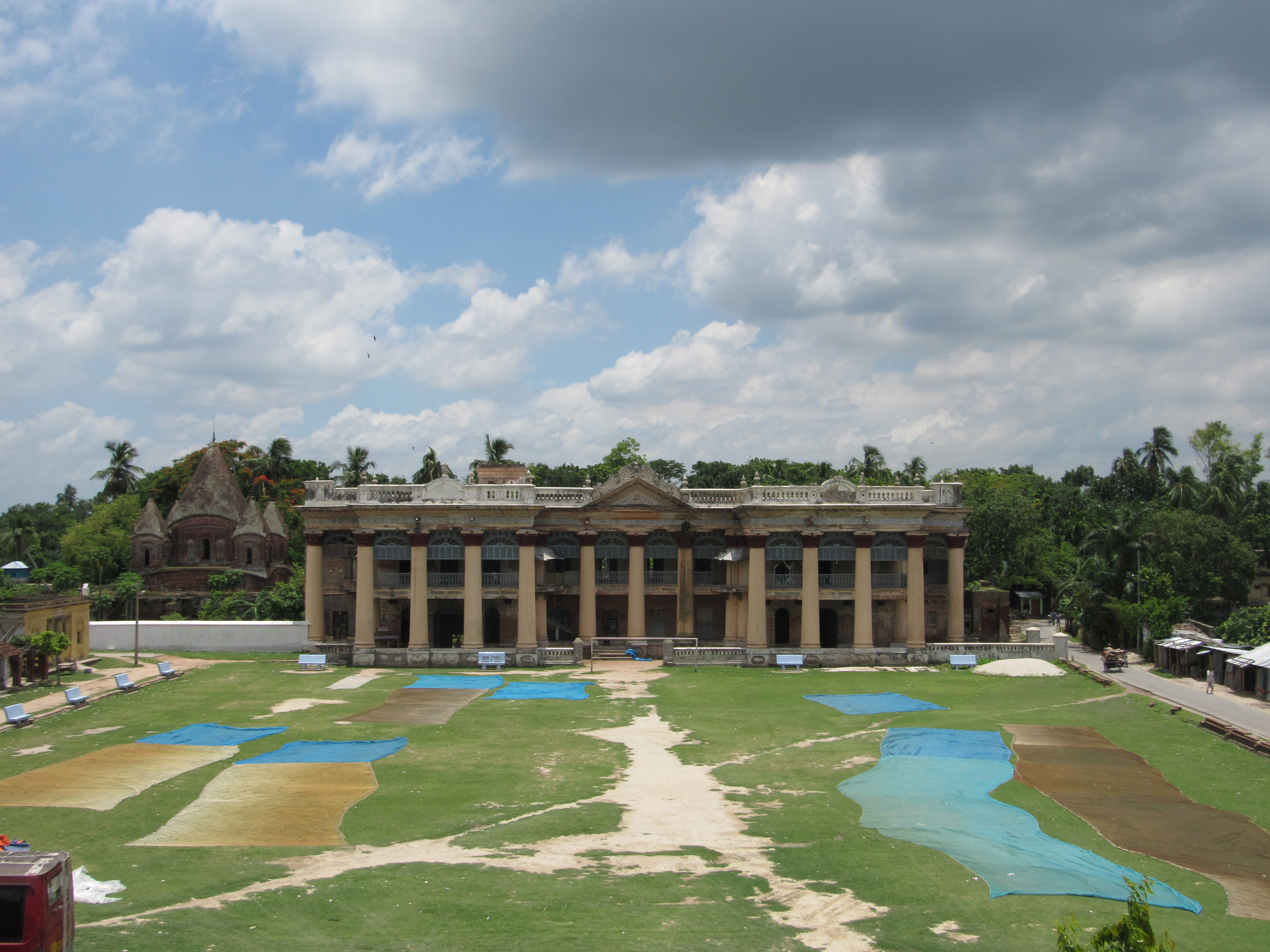
The Puthia Rajbari

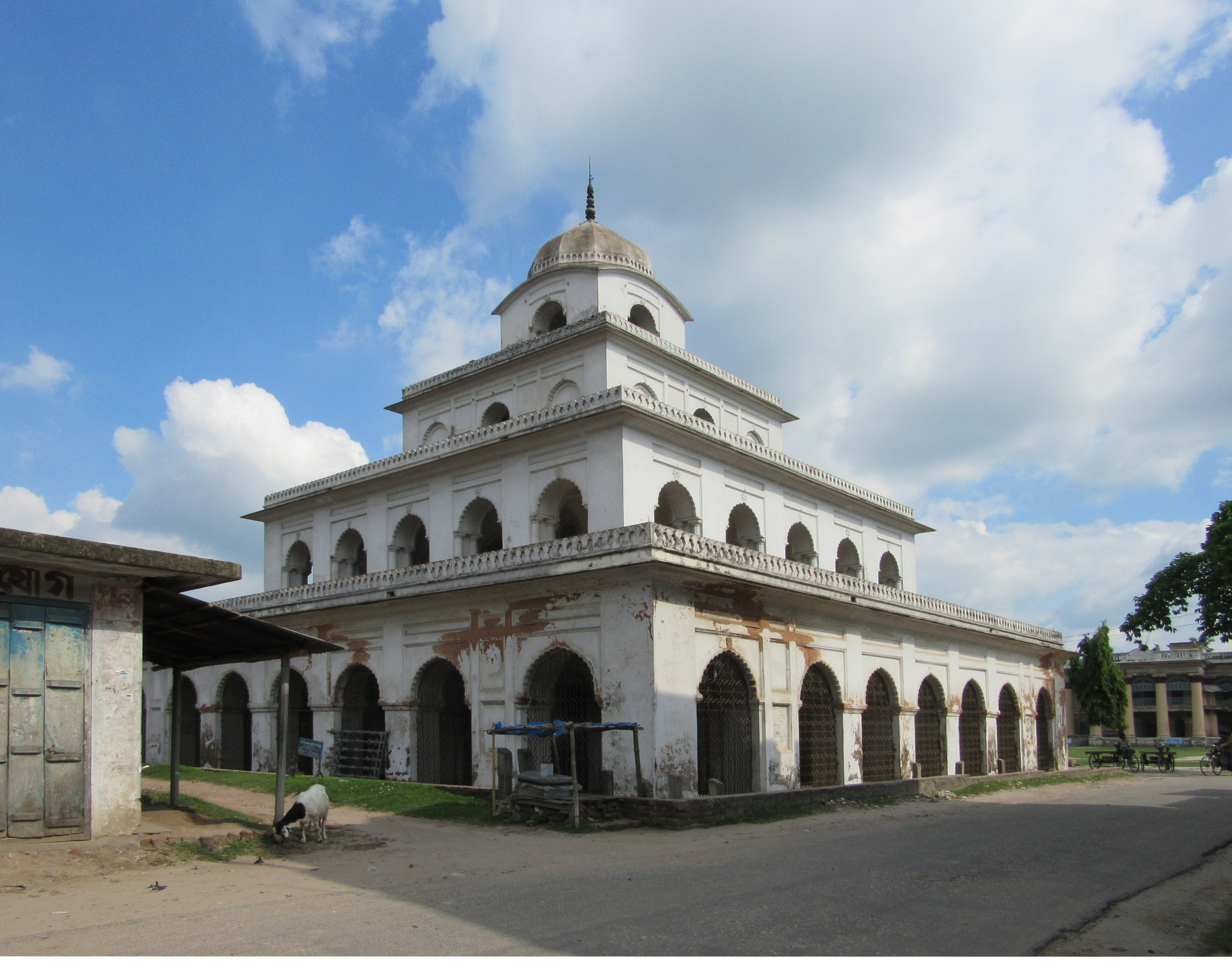
Dol Mandir at Puthia

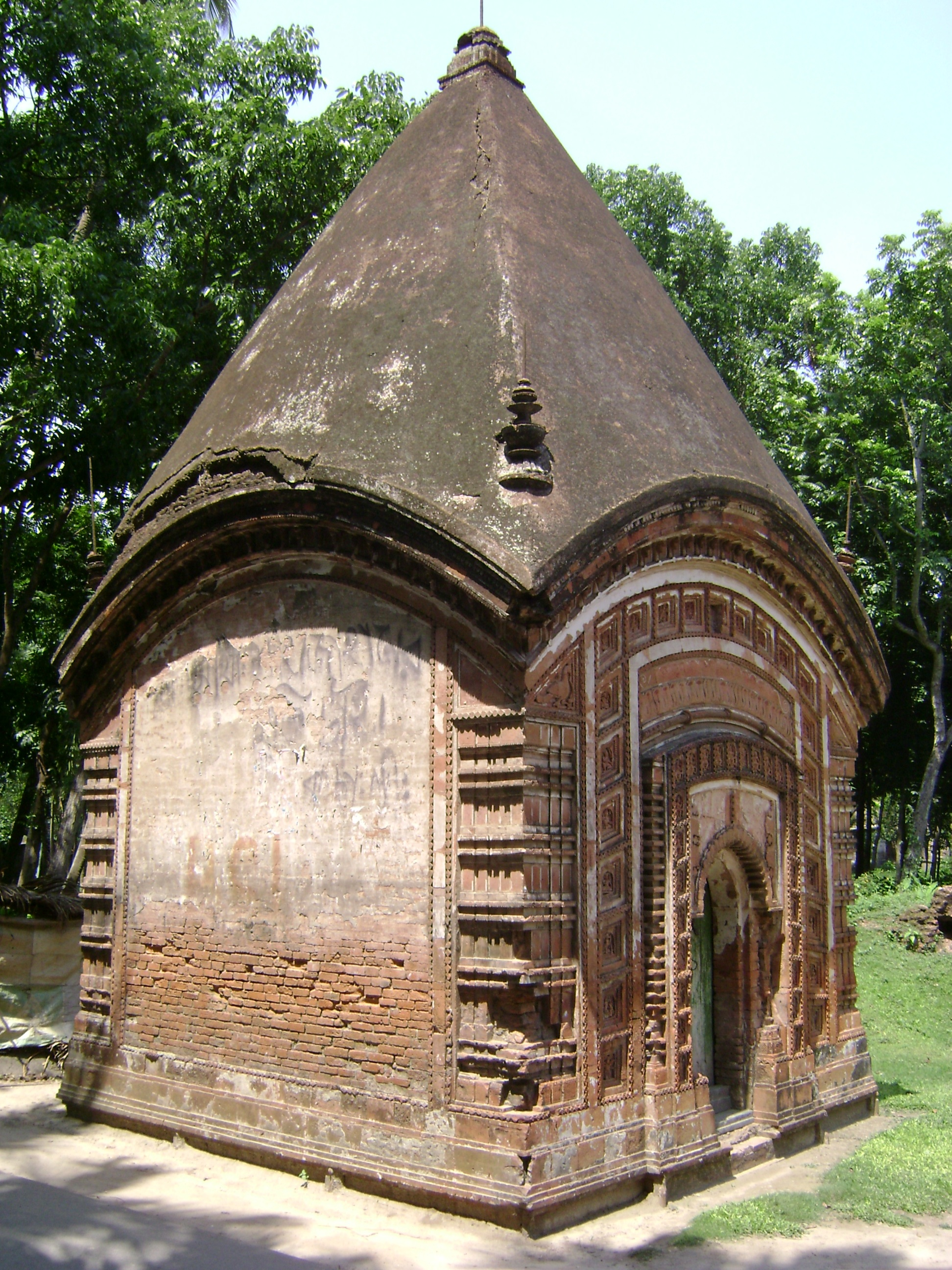
Choto Shiv Mandir

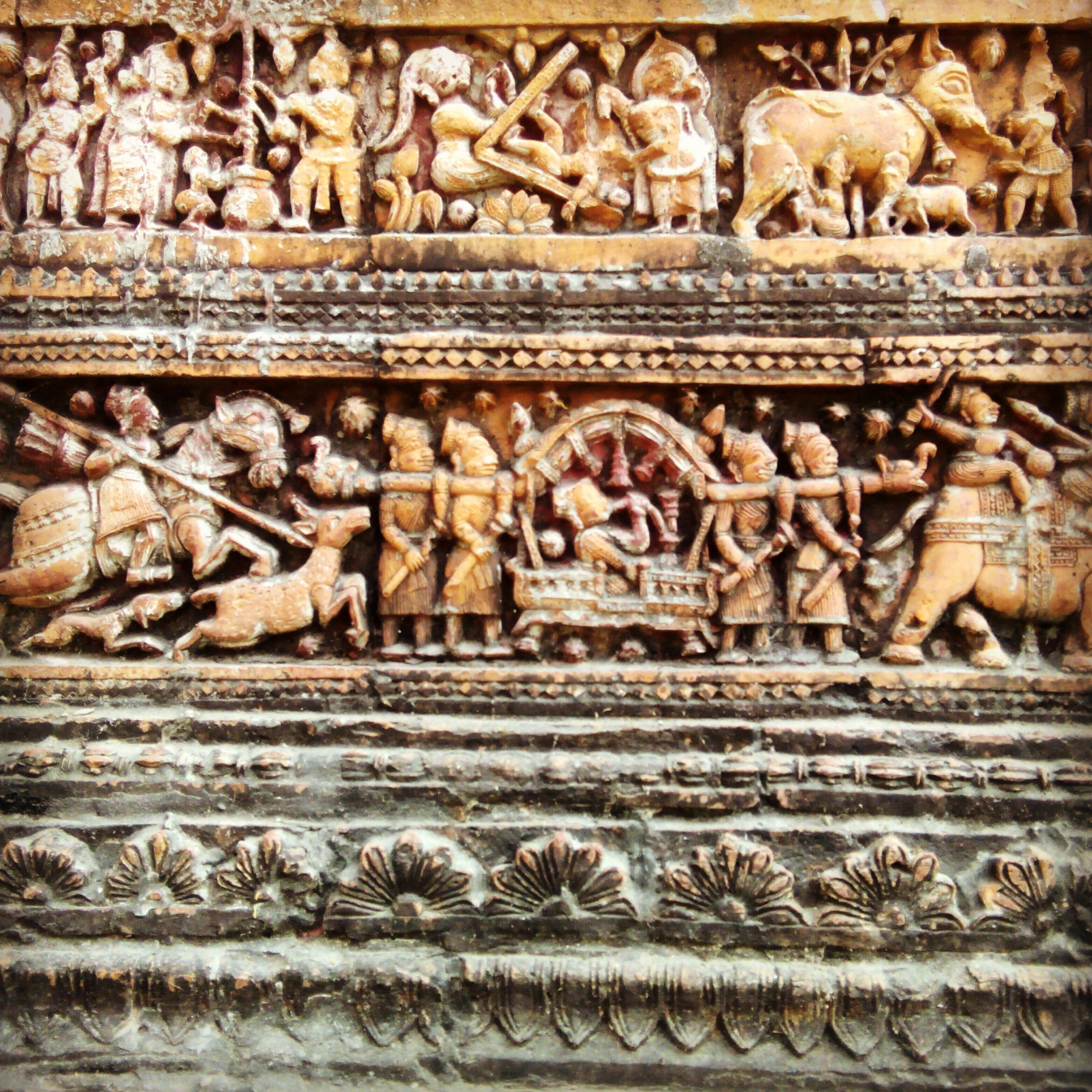
terracotta work at govinda mandir

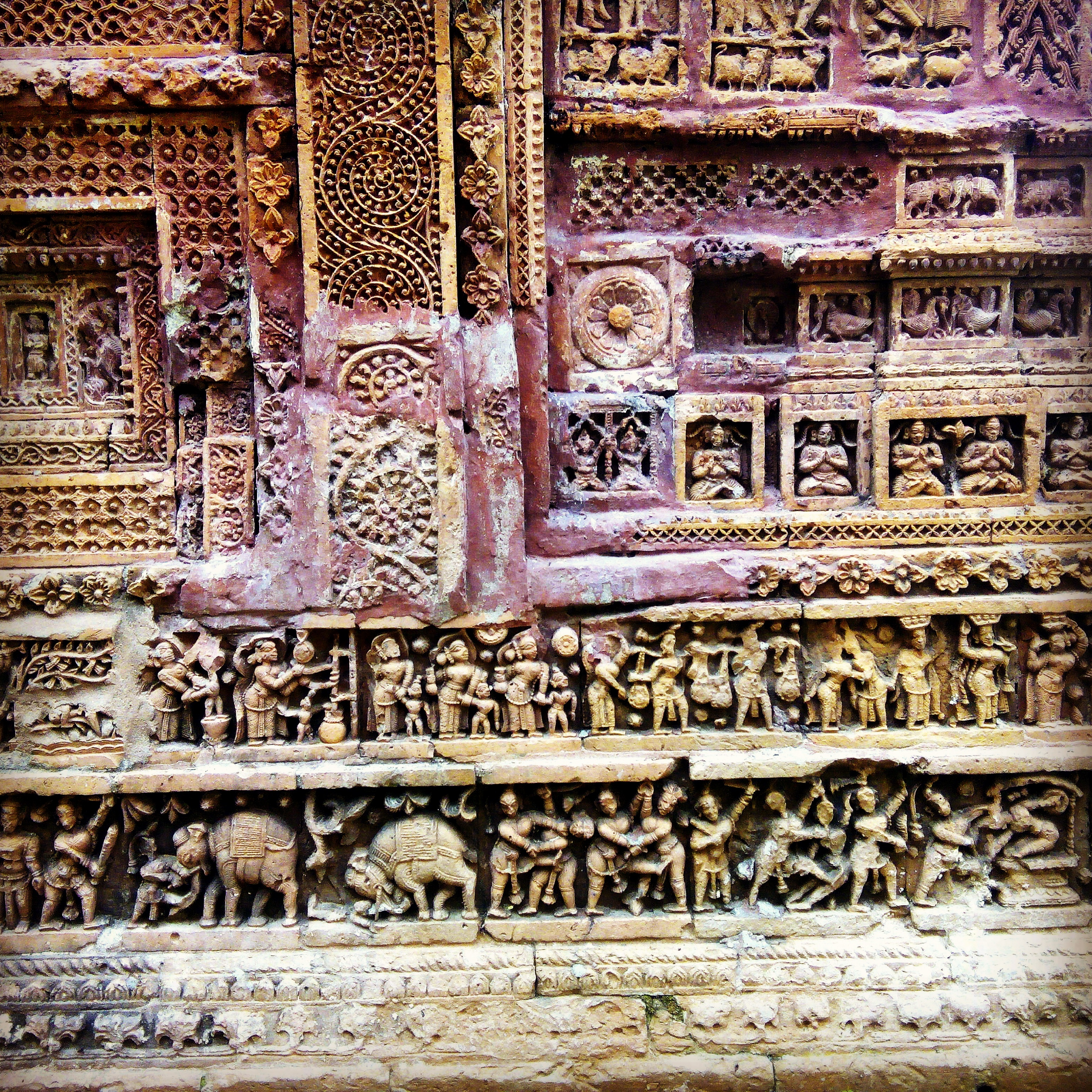
massive and detailed terracotta work at the govinda mandir of puthia, rajshahi
