= Puthia Rajbari =

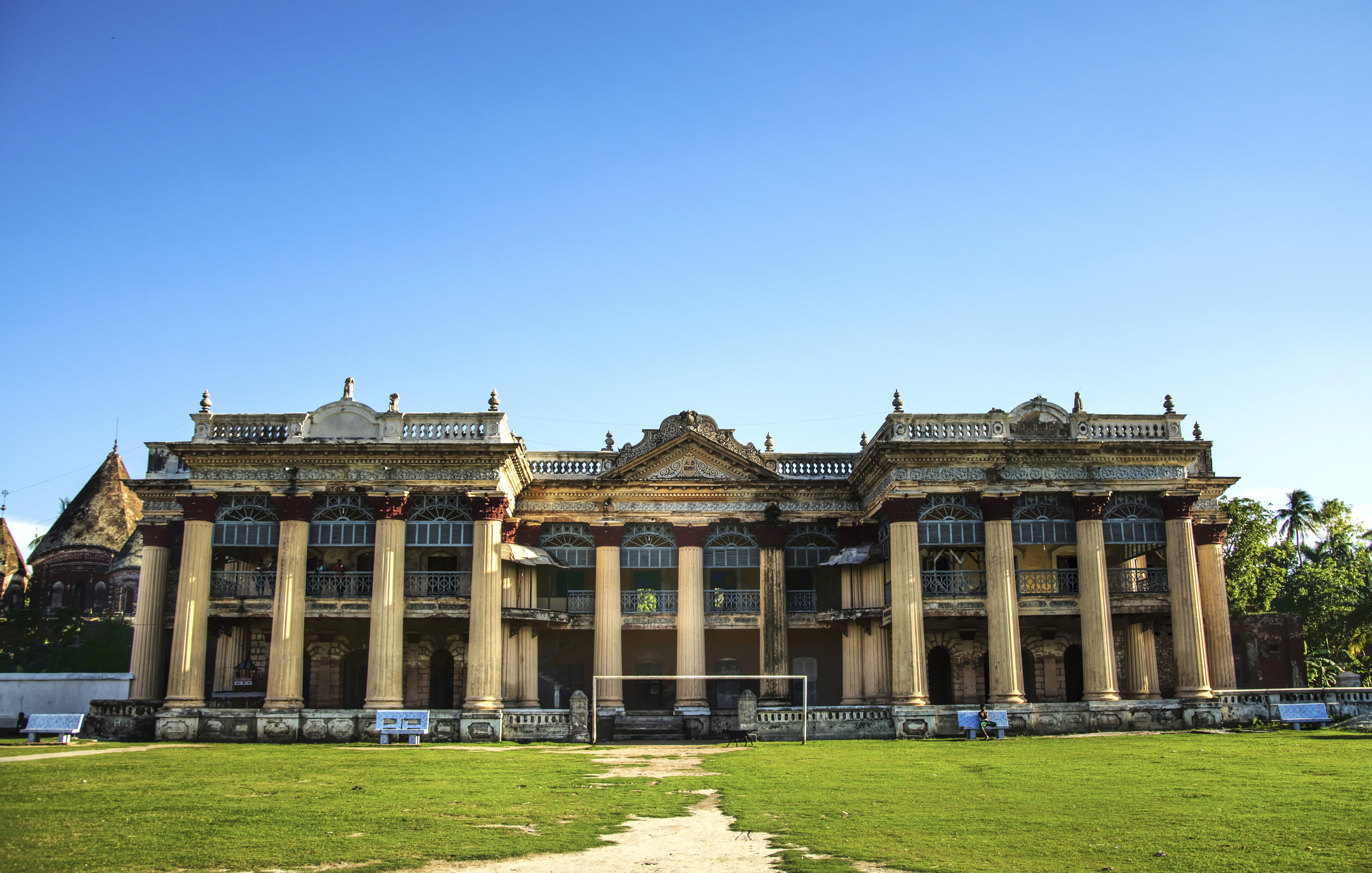
- Puthia Rajbari in 2015
- Interactive map of Puthia Rajbari
- 24.3633°N 88.8355°E
- Location: Puthia, Rajshahi, Bangladesh

History
- Built: 1895

Site notes
- Architectural style: Indo-Saracenic Revival architecture

Puthia Rajbari is a palace in Puthia Upazila, Rajshahi District in Bangladesh. It was built in 1895, by Maharani Hemanta Kumari Devi in the memory of her mother-in-law Maharani Saratsundari Devi, it is an example of Indo-Saracenic Revival architecture. The palace is sited on the Rajshahi Natore highway 30 km from the east of the town and one km south from Rajshahi Natore highway. Currently it houses a museum narrating the history of Puthia and its adjoining area.

== History ==
Initially, Puthia was a village of Laskarpur Pargana, named after Laskar Khan Nilamber (Brahmin zamindar Nilambar was granted the honorary title “Laskar Khan” by Mughal Emperor Jahangir in the early 17th century), the brother of the first zamindar of Puthia, who was the first to receive the title of Raja from the Mughal emperor Jahangir. A partition of the estate took place in 1744 and the zamindari was divided among 4 co shares among whom the panch ani (five annas) and char ani (four annas) co-shares become famous in conducting jamindary.

== Structure ==
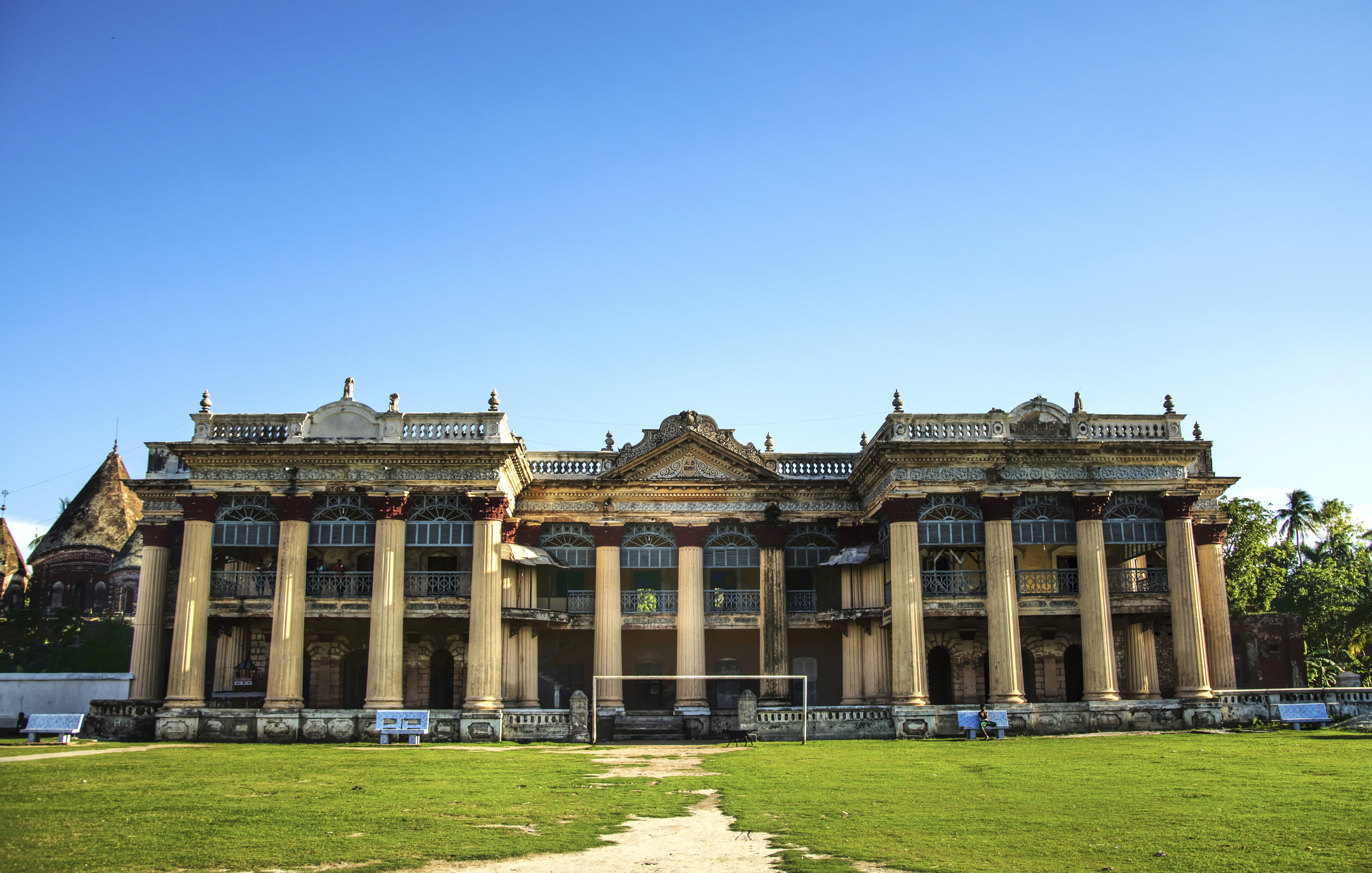
Front of Puthia Palace

Puthia Rajbari is surrounded by ditches. The south end of an open field is where panch ani palace is situated. 4.31 acres of land was used for the Rajbari. The once strong walls surrounding the place are now damaged in places. The rajbari is divided into 4 courts :

- Kachhari (office) Angan (court)
- Mandir angan or Gobindabari (temple court)
- Andar Mahal (inner quarters)
- Residence of Maharani Hemanta Kumari Devi

The rooms are built around the courts in the palace, with the exception of the Kachari Angan, the courts are one storeyed. Kachari Angan has porticos on both the west and east ends which project in the Palladian manner. The west entrance gate leads to Kachari Angan while the other leads to Temple or Gobindabari courts. Each portico is supported by 4 semi-Corinthian columns rising the full height of the building. The porticos contain arcaded, semi-glazed loggias at the first floor level. The building's central portion, between the porticos, continues the columned theme and also has a loggia at first floor level. Also here the 4 semi Corinthian pillars cover the upper parts of the building. A wooden staircase leads to the upper floor on the east side. There are three rooms of different size, two of which were used as treasuries. The other side, (Western) has 4 rooms with two verandahs. Close to Govindabari, there are two small rooms with verandah. Now, most of the rooms built on the east and south of Kachari Angan are at ruins.

The northern block of the building with east–west axis is double storeyed and has a wide hall of 21.95m x 7.16m. The upper storeyed portion has six variously announced rooms. In front of the hall there is a wide verandah with balconies on either side. The Pancharatna Gobinda temple is located at the Gobindabari of this palace. The temple is beautifully ornamented with terracotta carvings. There are two rooms and several bathrooms in the western part of Andar Mahal. Most of the rooms in the court in western part of Andar Mahal are in ruins. In the eastern part of Ander Mahal there is one storeyed residence of Rani Hemanta Kumari. It has a porch in front of it and a central reception hall with nine rooms. There are extended verandahs with arches in front and rear of the hall room. Iron and wooden beams have been used in the roof.

== Current condition ==
The proud palace in Rajshahi has been losing its appearance as an ornamental terracotta piece. The antiques from various structures are decaying or been stolen in the absence of proper care from the archaeological department. Recent research showed that large amounts of terracotta from Chotto Anik Temple, Boro Gobindo Temple and Chotto Gobindo Temple have been destroyed or stolen, and the rest are at high risk of decaying because of high salinity. The country's rich heritage is endangered due to lack of strong commitment on the part of the archaeology department and the government. The locals and the experts are very disappointed, they still didn't see any effective steps taken to preserve the palace and its temples. The archaeology department even failed to put a boundary wall in place for the protection of the temples during the last 30 years. Cattle are seen walking around the 100-year-old place. A government declaration of the importance of Puthia's heritage to tourism has yet to be made. Reports of missing and looted items are filed every other day.

== Recent images ==
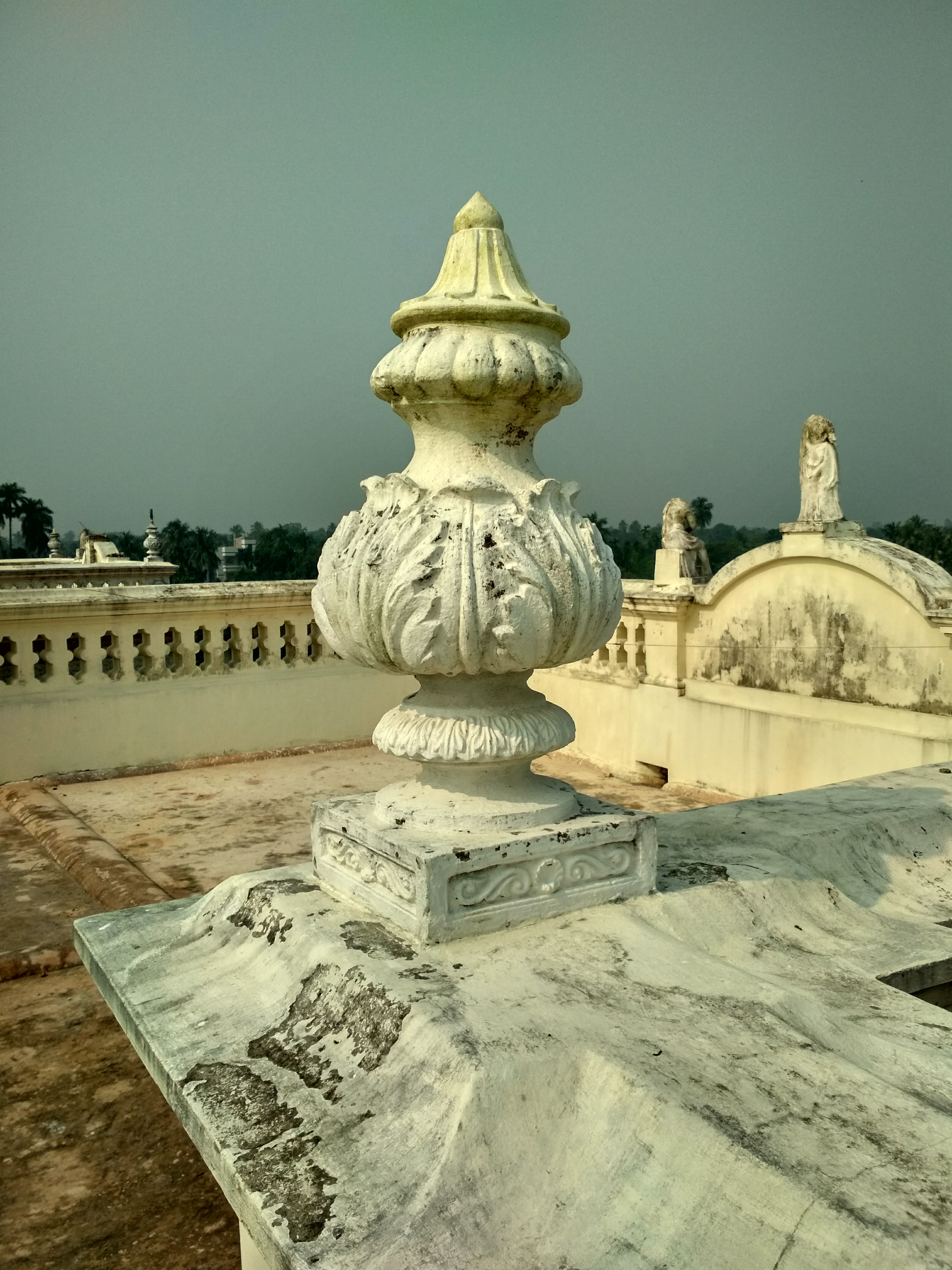
Roof

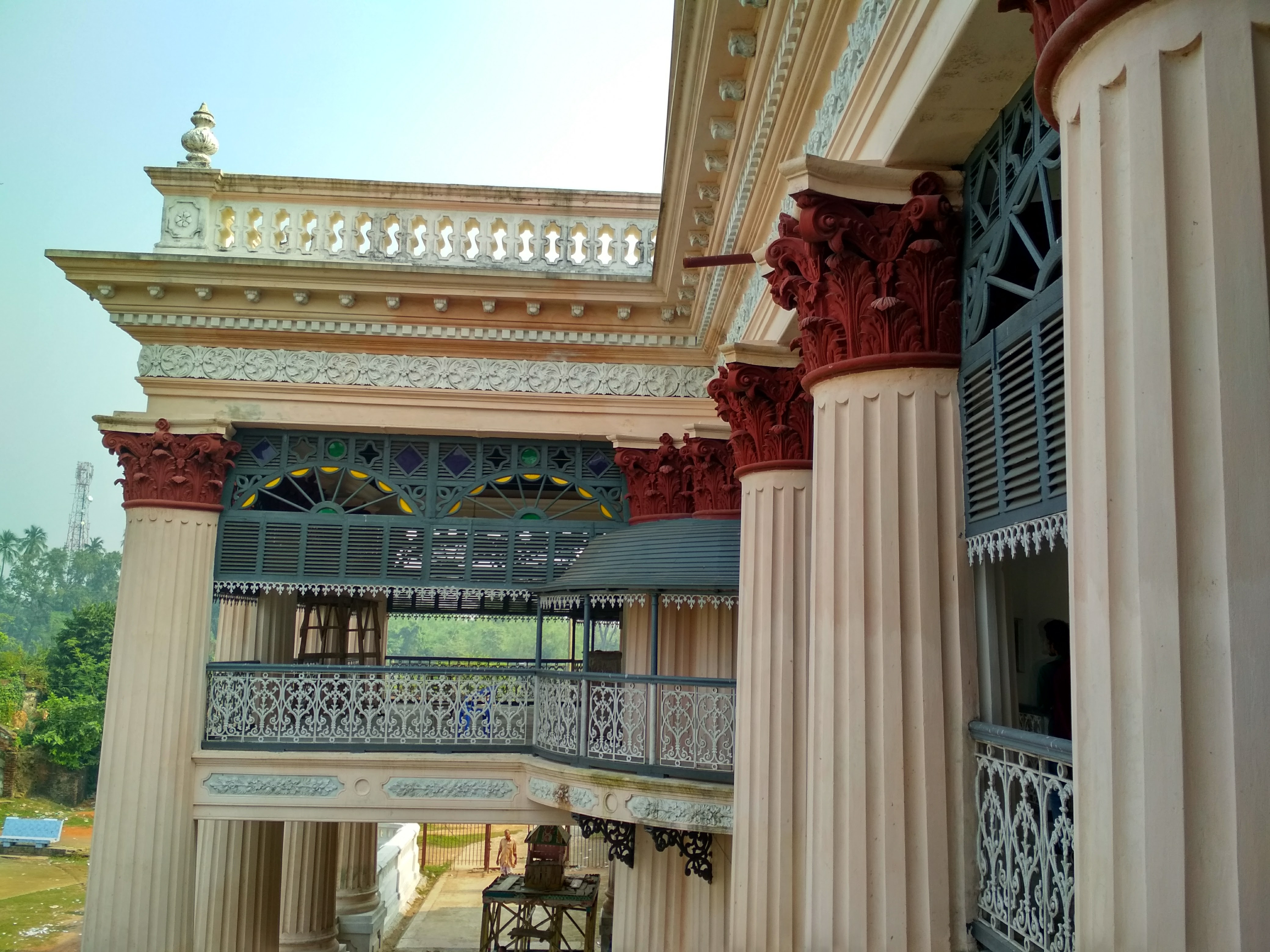
Front side

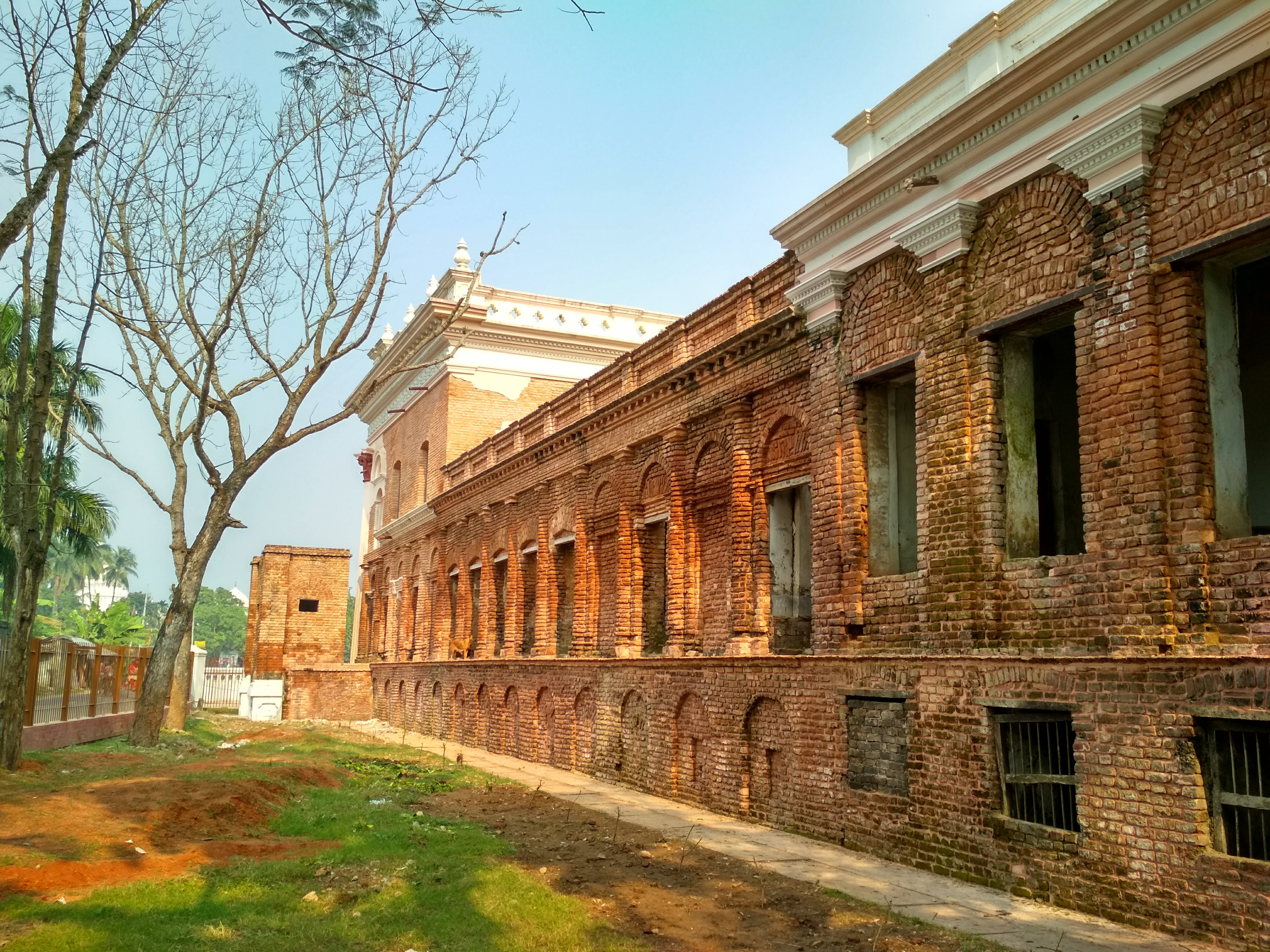
Right side

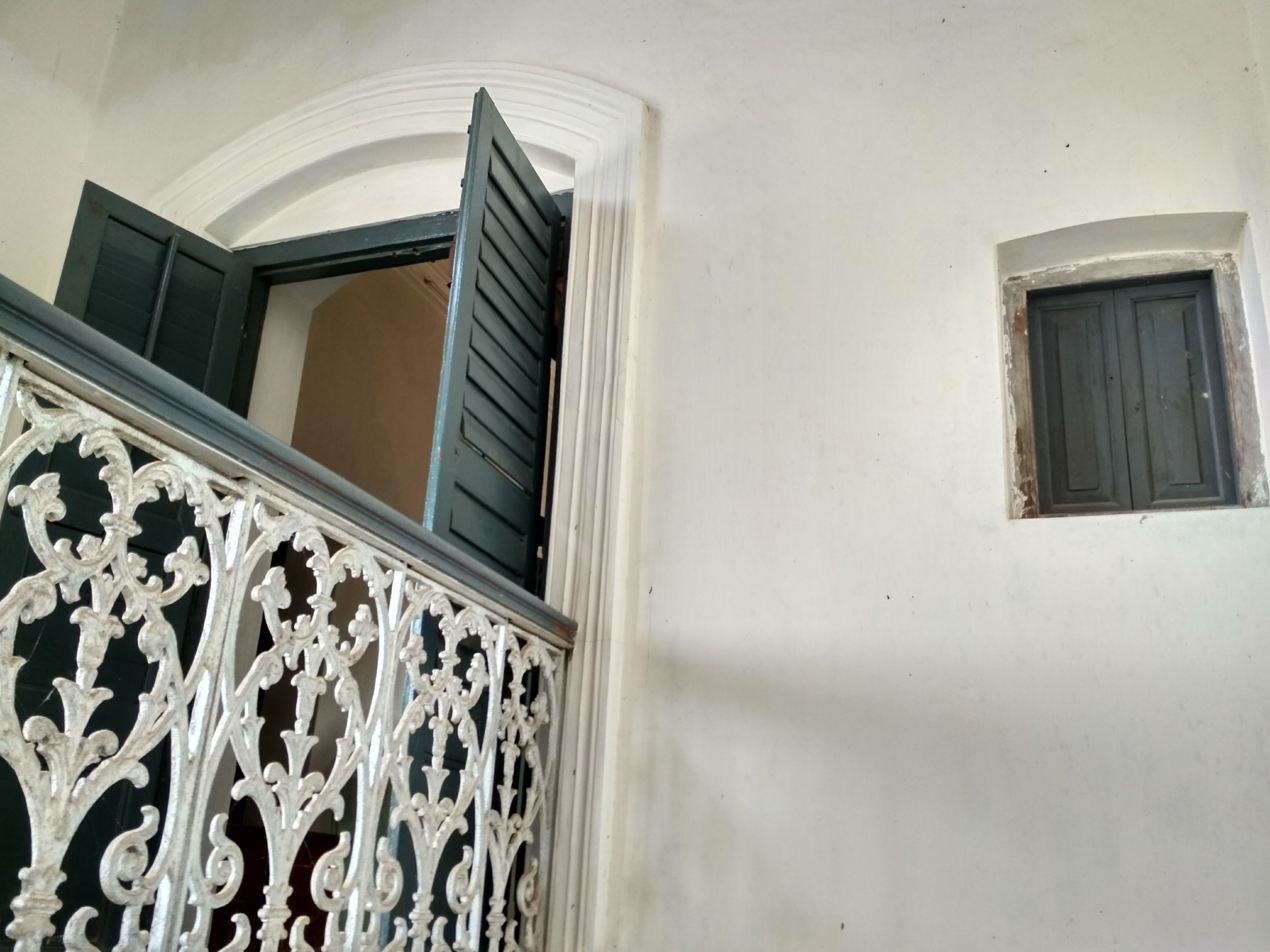
Interior

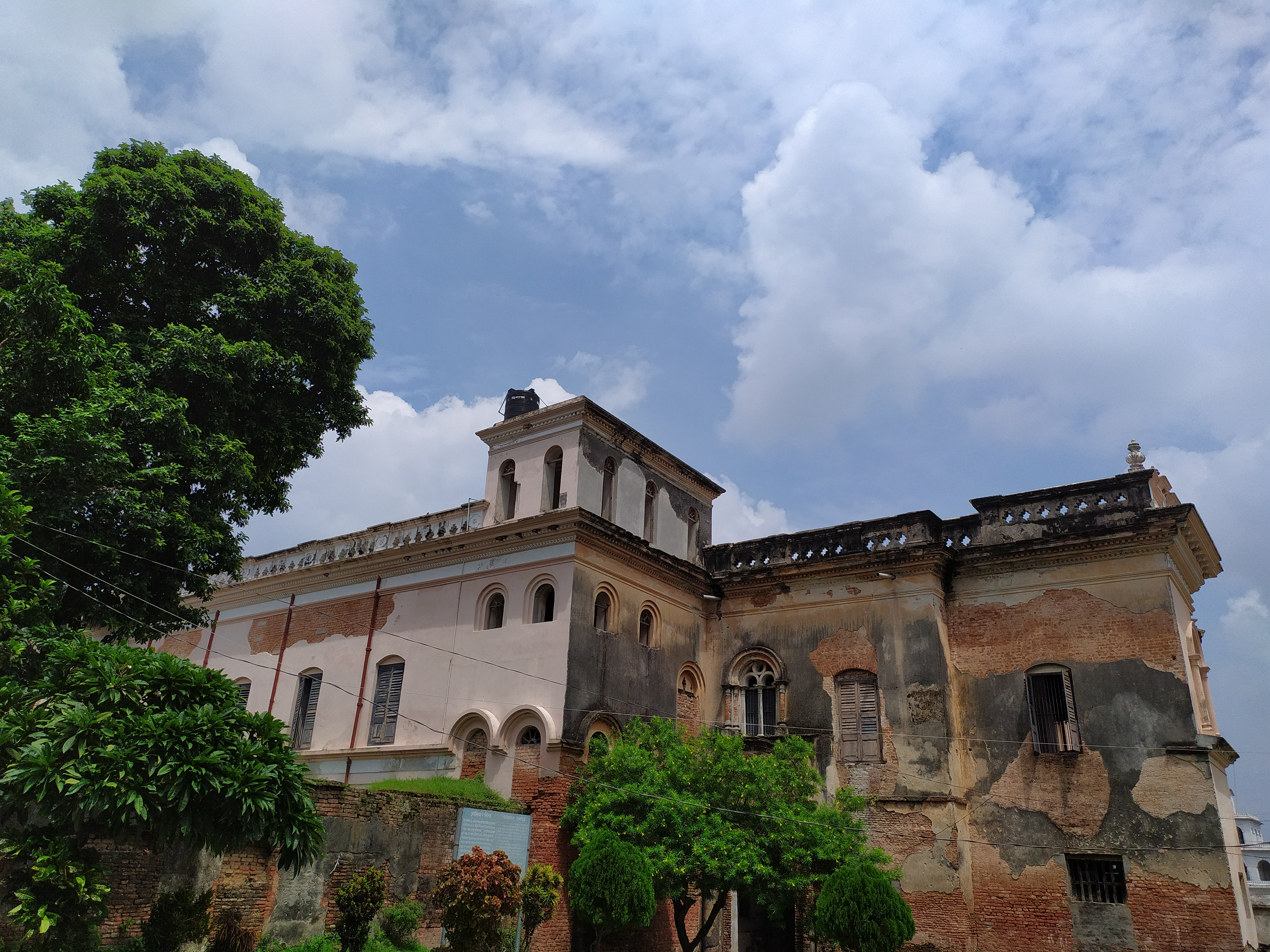
Rear side

== Archived photos ==
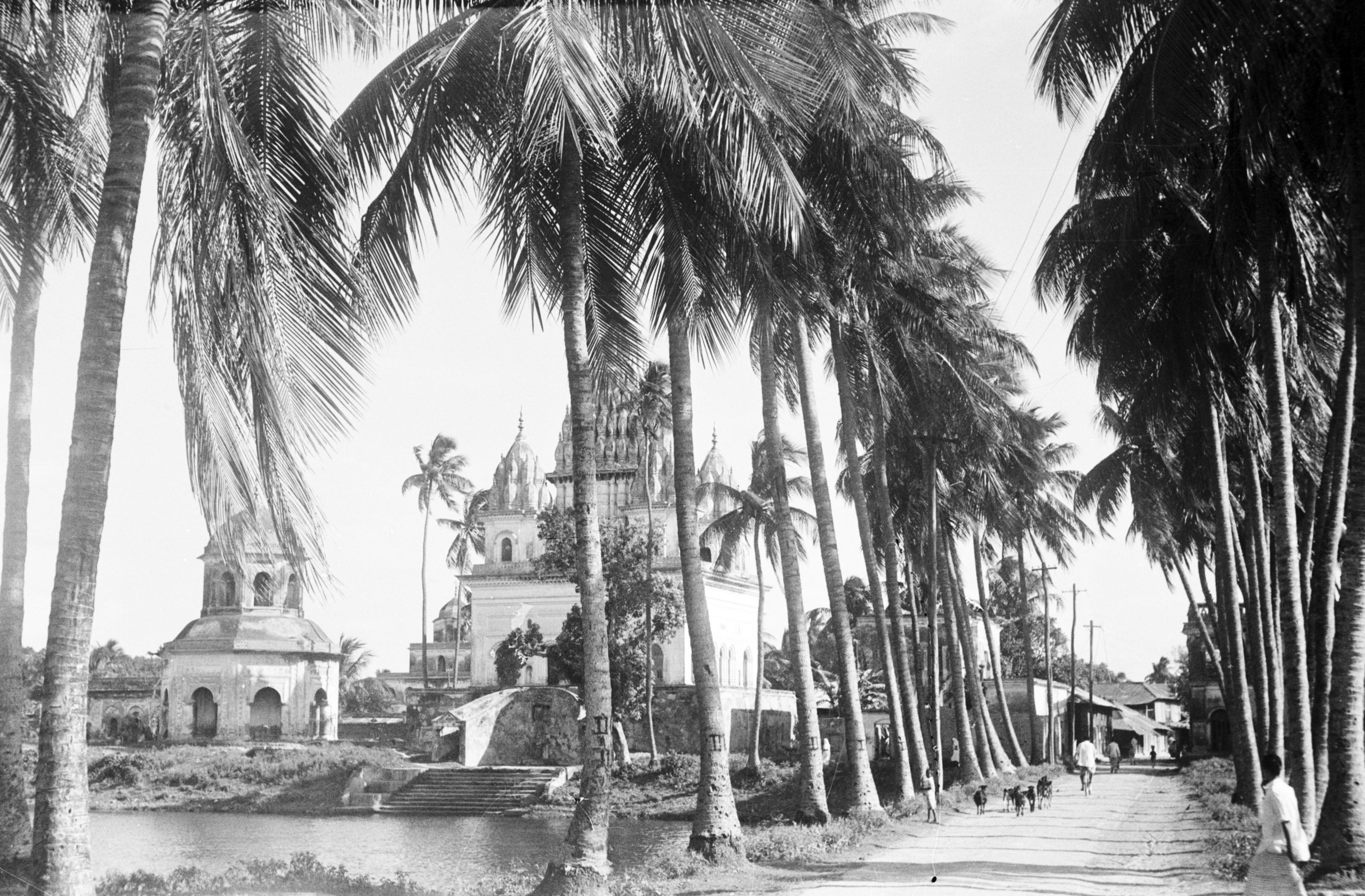
The approach avenue (1975 photo)

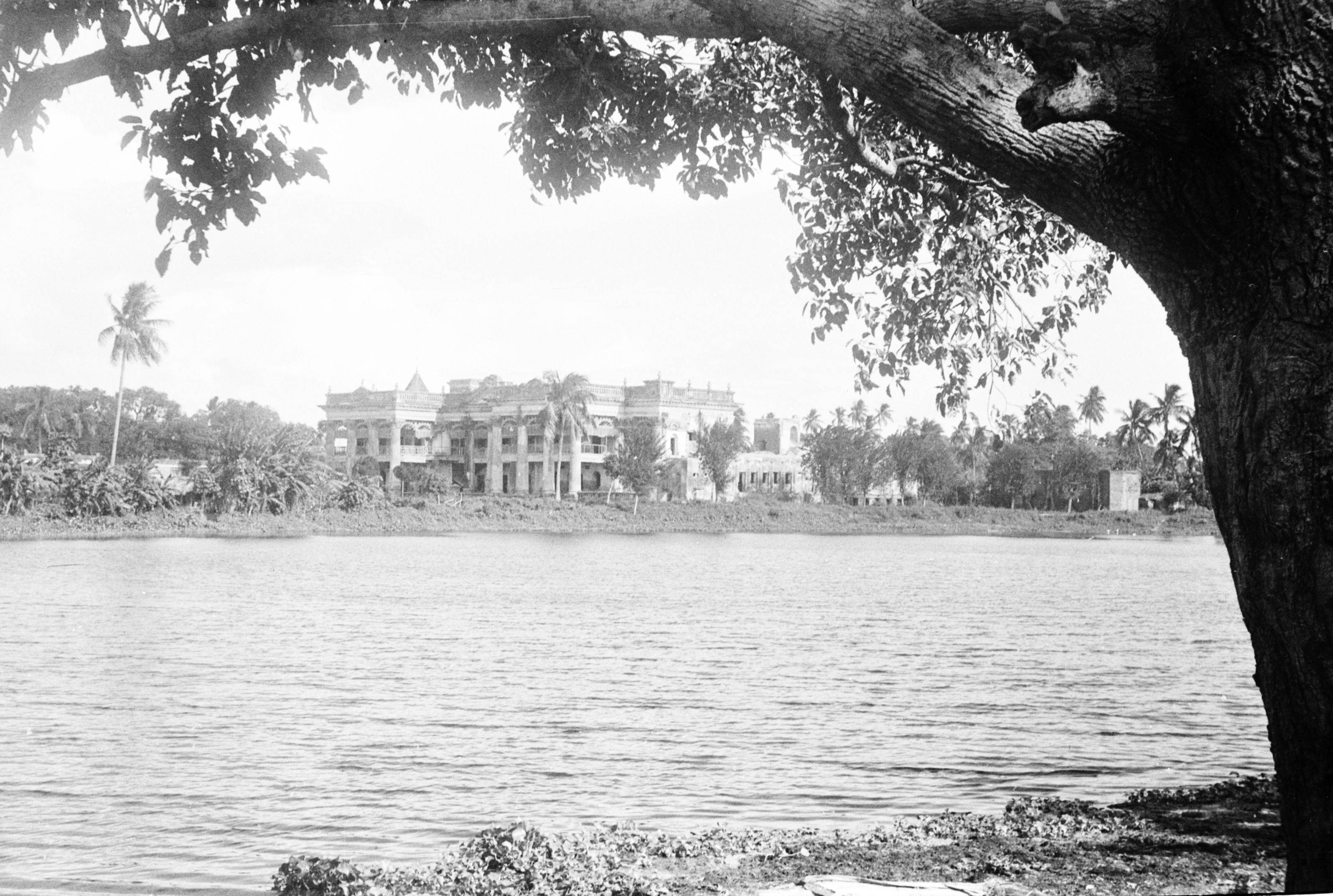
Lake and main palace (1975 photo)

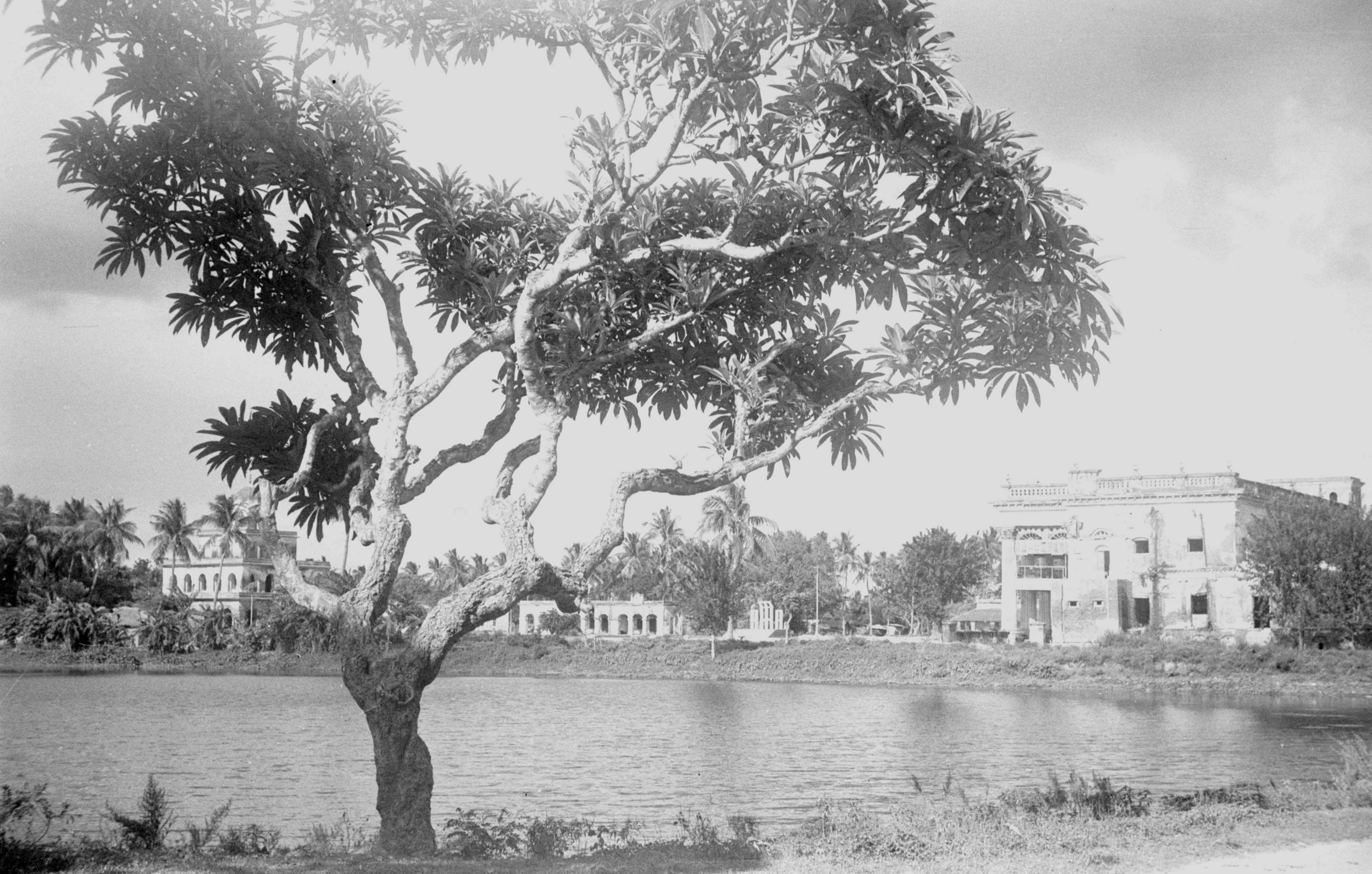
Palace, lake and temples (1975 photo)

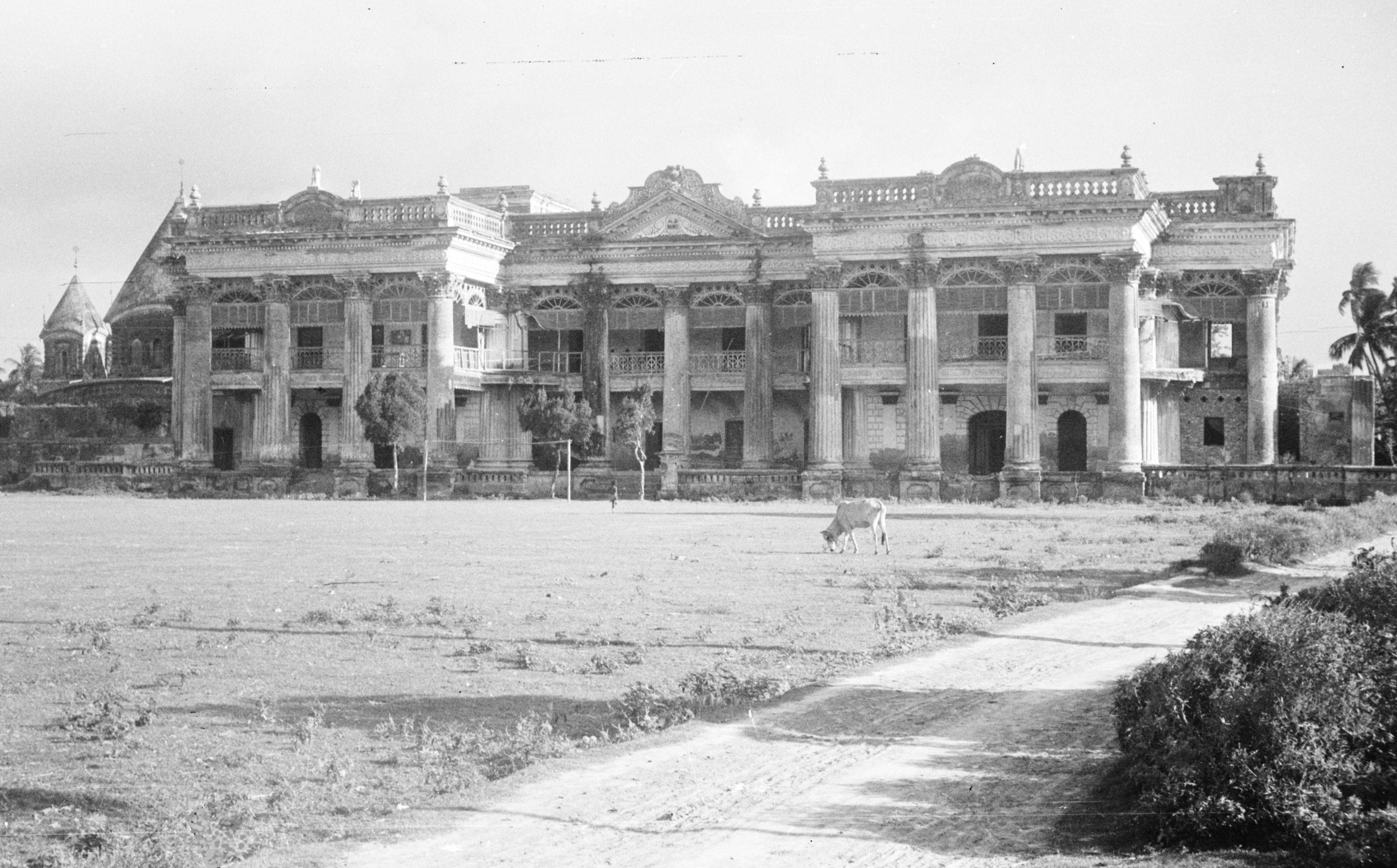
Main palace building (1975 photo)

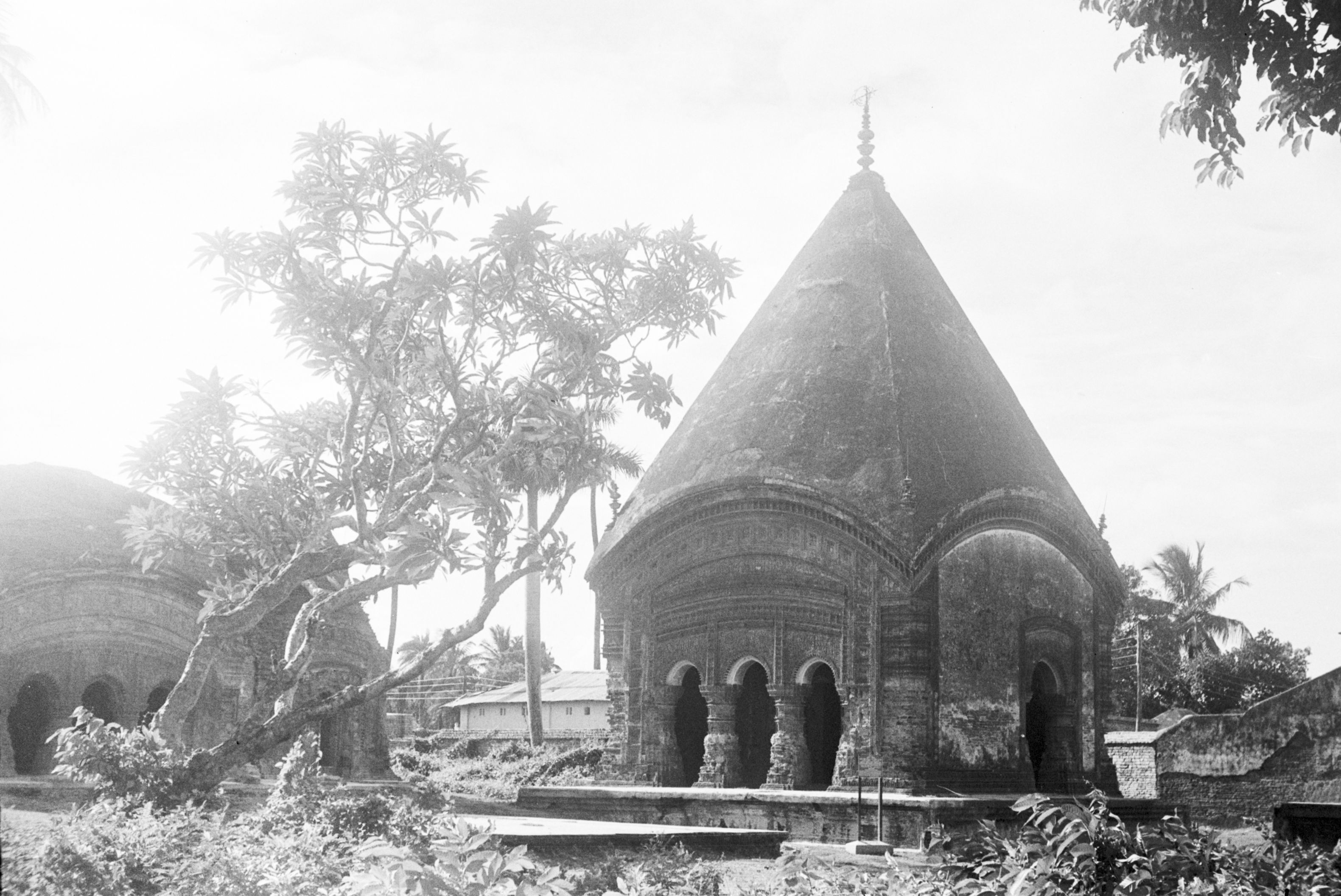
Choto Gobinda mandir (1975 photo)

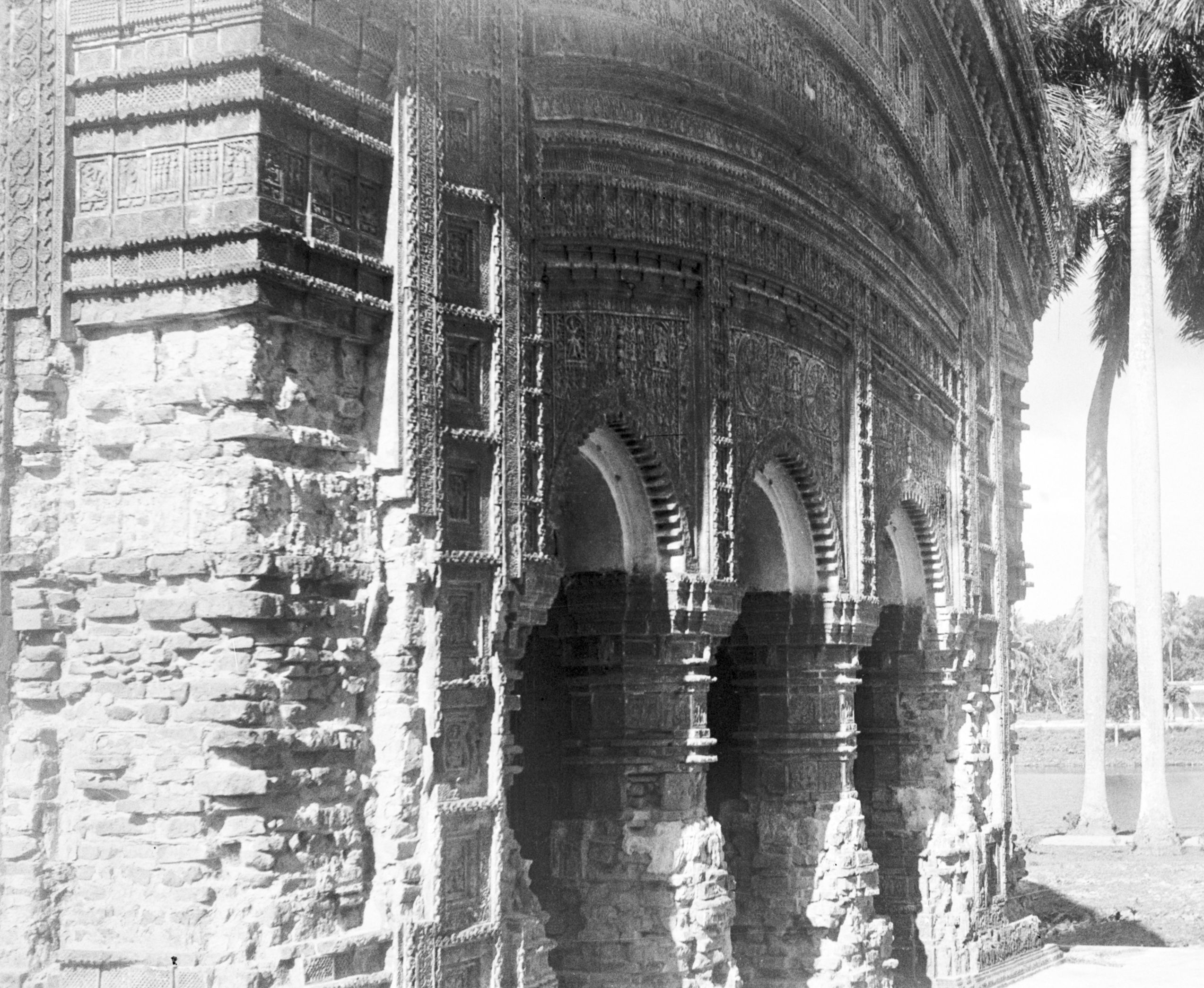
Facade of old mandir (1975 photo)

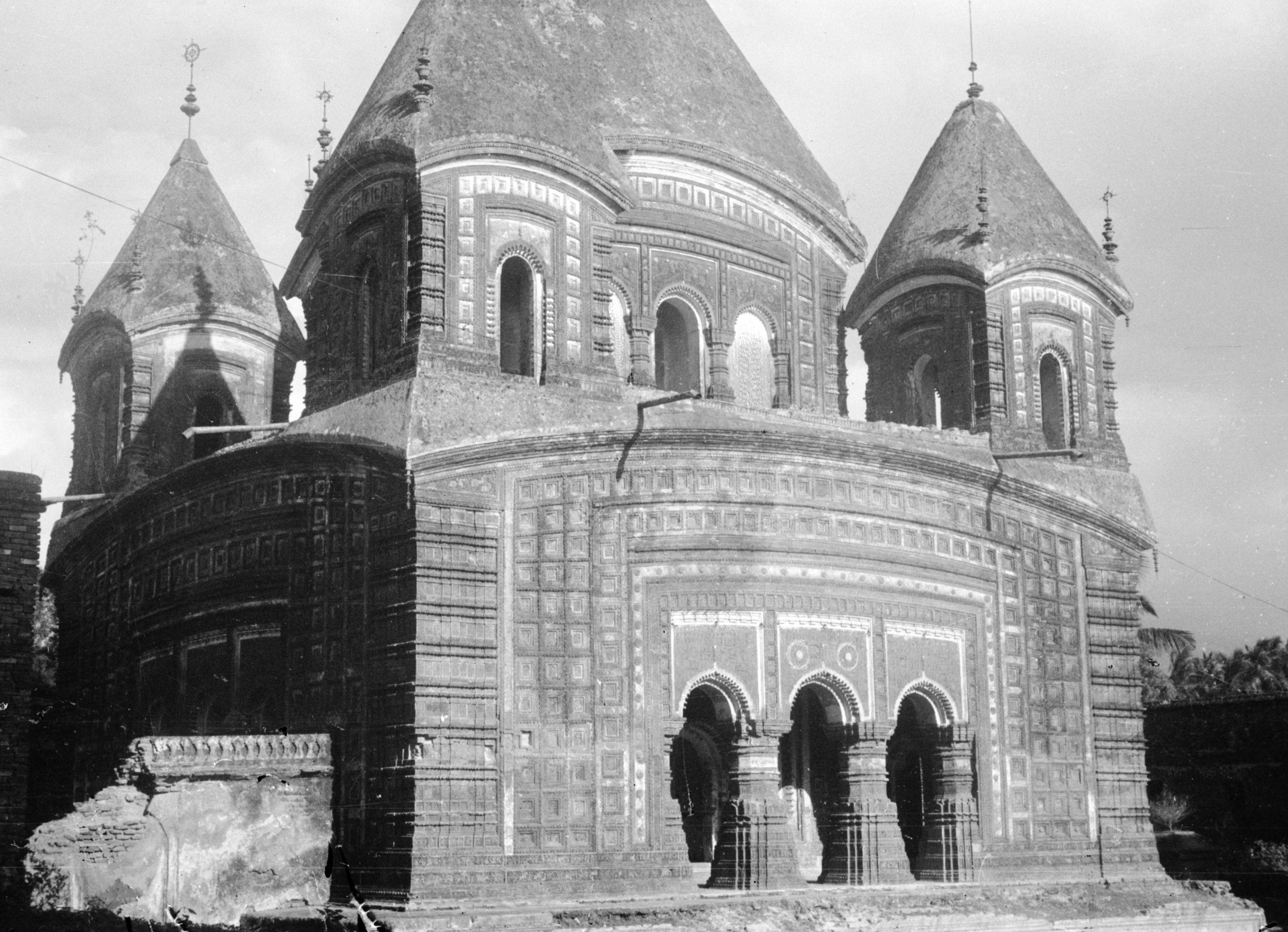
Boro Gobinda Pancharatna Mandir (1975 photo)

== See also ==
- Puthia Temple Complex
- List of archaeological sites in Bangladesh
