= List of archaeological sites in Bangladesh =

This article lists the ancient sites in Bangladesh. Below is a division-wise overview of some notable archaeological sites.

== Dhaka Division ==
=== Dhaka ===
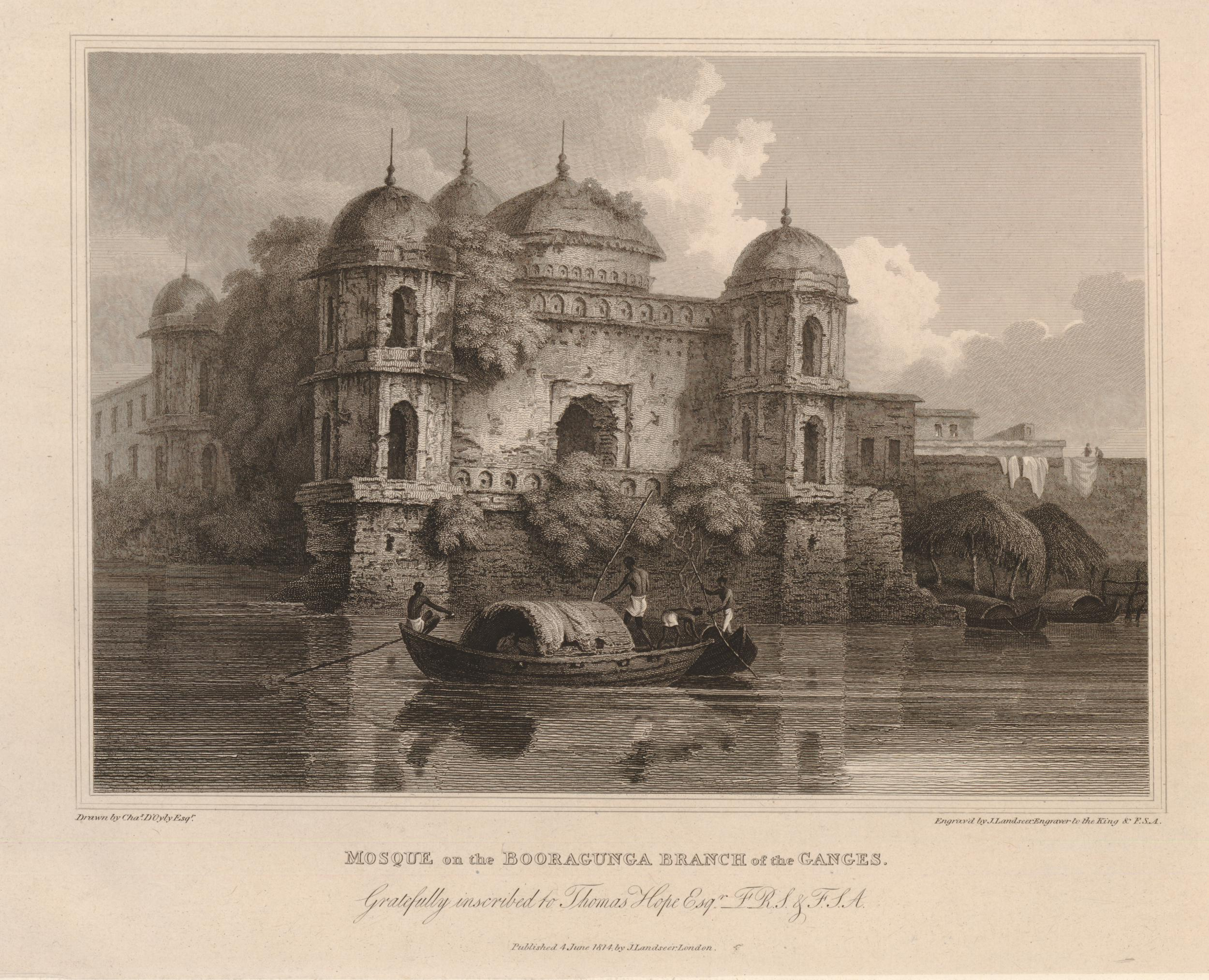
Artwork of Sat Masjid by Sir Charles D'Oyly, 1814.

- Ahsan Manzil
- Armenian Church, Dhaka
- Boro Katra
- Bhajahari Lodge
- Buckland Bund
- Chawk Mosque
- Chhoto Katra
- Curzon Hall
- Dhaka Gate
- Dhakeshwari Temple
- Greek Memorial, Dhaka
- Khan Mohammad Mridha Mosque
- Lalbagh Fort
- Lakshmibazar Shahi Mosque
- Musa Khan Mosque
- Northbrook Hall
- Old High Court Building, Dhaka
- Rose Garden Palace
- Ruplal House
- Sat Gambuj Mosque
- Shahbaz Khan Mosque
- Star Mosque

=== Faridpur ===
- Pathrail Mosque

=== Gazipur ===
- Bhawal Royal House
- Temple complex of Bhawal Zamidari
- Baraibari Archeological site
- Dardaria Fort

=== Kishoreganj ===
- Jangalbari Fort

=== Manikganj ===
- Baliati Palace
- Tewta Zamindar House

=== Munshiganj ===
- Baba Adam's Mosque
- Idrakpur Fort
- Nateshwar Deul
- Sonarag Twin Temples
- Mir Kadim Bridge
- Sir Jagadish Chandra Bose Complex and Museum
- Bikrampur Vihara
- Atisha Dipanker Memorial Complex
- Harishchandra Dighi

=== Narayanganj ===
- Baliapara Zamindar House
- Bandar Shahi Mosque
- Boro Sarder House
- Fath Shah's Mosque
- Goaldi Mosque
- Gopaldi Zamindar House
- Murapara Rajbari
- Hajiganj Fort
- Lokenath Brahmachari Ashram
- Neel Kuthi
- Panam Nagar
- Sonakanda Fort
- Sonargaon

=== Narsingdi ===
- Girish Chandra Sen's House
- Parulia Shahi Mosque
- Asam King's Fort
- Wari-Bateshwar
- Ramnagar Jame Mosque

=== Tangail ===
- Atia Mosque
- Deldua Zamindar House
- Dhanbari Zamindar Bari
- Hemnagar Zamindar House
- Mohera Zamindar House
- Pakutia Zamindar House

Source: Department of Archeology

== Mymensingh Division ==
=== Mymensingh ===
- Alexander Castle
- Ramgopalpur Zamindar House
- Muktagacha Zamindar Bari
- Shashi Lodge
- Bhuiya Bari Jame Mosque
- Rajeshwari Temple

=== Netrokona ===
- Kot Bari Fort
- Buruz Mound
- Royalbari Fort
- Ranikhong Mission

=== Sherpur ===
- Ghagra Khan Bari Jame Mosque

=== Jamalpur ===
- Jamalpur Shahi Mosque
- Tomb of Shah Kamal
- Narapara Fort
- Khirtala Village Mounds

== Chittagong Division ==
=== Brahmanbaria ===
- Arifil Shrine
- Arifil Mosque
- Bariura Old Bridge
- Haripur Barabari
- Ulchapara Mosque

=== Chandpur ===
- Lohagarh Math
- Rupsha Zamindar Bari

=== Chittagong ===
- Darul Adalat
- Pandit Vihara

=== Cumilla ===
- Kutila Mura
- Shalban Vihara

=== Noakhali ===
- Bajra Shahi Mosque

=== Lakshmipur ===
- Dalal Bazar Zamindar Bari
- Jinn Mosque
- Tita Khan Jami Mosque
- Khoa-Sagor Dighi
- Kamala Sundari Dighi
- Sahapur Saheb Palace
- Kaman Khola Zamindar Bari
- Neelkuthi Bari
- Shayestanagar Zamindar Bari
- Ishaq Zamindar Bari
- Majupur Matka Mosque
- Dayem Shah Mosque
- Abdullahpur Jami Mosque

== Sylhet Division ==
=== Habiganj ===
- Shankarpasha Shahi Masjid

=== Moulvibazar ===
- Prithimpassa Zamindar Bari

=== Sylhet ===
- Ghayebi Dighi Masjid
- Jaintia Rajbari

== Rajshahi Division ==
- Azim Choudhury Zamindar Bari
- Bagha Mosque
- Bara Anhik Mandir
- Chatmohar Shahi Mosque
- Chota Anhik Mandir
- Choto Sona Mosque
- Darasbari Mosque
- Dhania Chalk Mosque
- Dol-Mandir
- Gokul Medh
- Govinda Vita
- Halud Vihara
- Hardinge Bridge
- Jagaddala Mahavihara
- Kherua Mosque
- Kismat Maria Mosque
- Kusumba Mosque
- Mahasthangarh
- Mangalkot (ancient sculpture)
- Mughal Tahakhana
- Natore Rajbari
- Pancha Ratna Govinda Temple
- Pancha Ratna Shiva Temple
- Puthia Rajbari
- Rohanpur Octagonal Tomb
- Somapura Mahavihara
- Uttara Ganabhaban
- Varendra Research Museum
- Vasu Vihara

== Rangpur Division ==
=== Dinajpur ===
- Gopalganj Twin Temple
- Kantajew Temple

=== Lalmonirhat ===
- Lost Mosque

=== Panchagarh ===
- Bhitagarh Fort City

=== Rangpur ===
- House of Begum Rokeya
- Tajhat Palace

== Khulna Division ==
- Bharat Bhayna Buddhist Temple
- Bharat Rajar Deul
- Dalijhara Vihara
- Chunakhola Mosque
- Galakata Mosque
- Jorbangla Mosque
- Khedapara Mound
- Masjidkur Mosque
- Mirzanagar Hammamkhana
- Modhu polli
- Mound of Dam Dam Peer
- Nine Dome Mosque
- Noongola Mosque
- Rabindra Complex
- Singar Mosque
- Sixty Dome Mosque
- Tetulia Jami Mosque
- Zinda Pir's Tomb Complex

== Barishal Division ==
=== Barguna ===
- Bibi Chini Mosque

=== Barishal ===
- Collectorate Bhaban, Barishal
- Kamalapur Mosque
- Kirtipasha Zamindar House
- Miah Bari Mosque
- Mahilara Sarkar Math
- Nasrat Gazi Mosque
- Qasba Mosque

=== Jhalokathi ===
- Kirtipasha Zamindar Bari

=== Patuakhali ===
- Majidbaria Shahi Mosque
