= Chatmohar Shahi Mosque =

Mughal mosque in Pabna, Bangladesh

- চাটমোহর শাহী মসজিদ
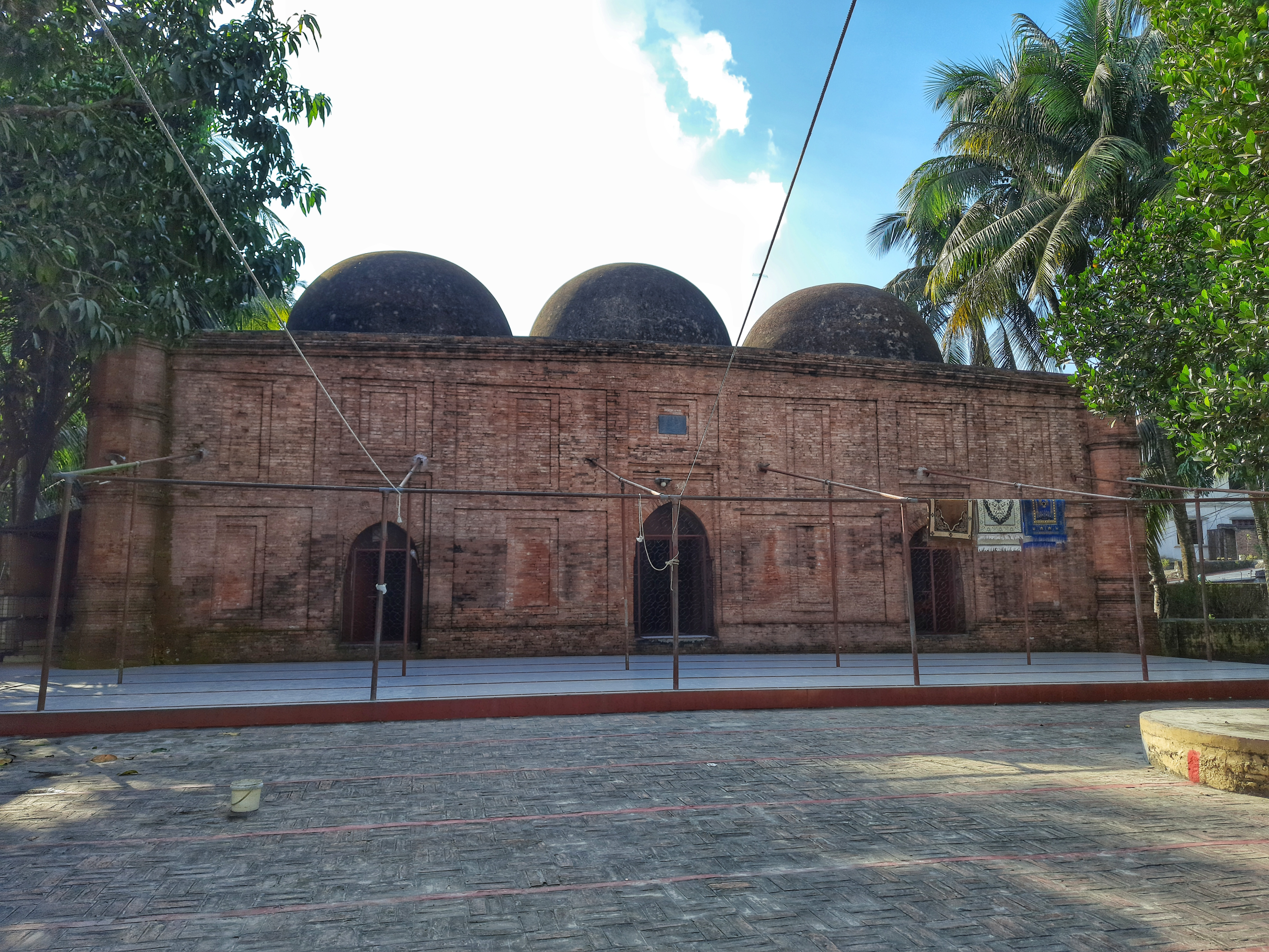

- Location within Bangladesh

Religion
- Affiliation: Islam
- Status: Active

Location
- Location: Chatmohar, Pabna District, Bangladesh
- Interactive map of Chatmohar Shahi Mosque
- Administration: Department of Archeology
- Coordinates: 24.227529°N 89.291132°E

Architecture
- Type: Mosque architecture
- Style: Bengal Sultanate Mughal
- Founder: Khan Muhammad bin Tuwi Khan Qaqshal
- Funded by: Masum Khan Kabuli
- Established: 1582; 444 years ago

Specifications
- Length: 45 ft (14 m)
- Width: 22.5 ft (6.9 m)
- Interior area: 1,012.5 ft^{2} (94.06 m^{2})
- Height (max): 45 ft (14 m)
- Dome: 3
- Inscriptions: 1
- Materials: Brick

Chatmohar Mosque (Bengali: চাটমোহর শাহী মসজিদ) also known as Masum Khan's Mosque (Bengali: মাসুম খাঁর মসজিদ) is a 16th century Mughal mosque situated at Chatmohar Bazar in Chatmohar Upazila in Pabna district. The mosque was constructed in 1582 AD by Khan Muhammad bin Tuwi Khan Qaqshal under Masum Khan Kabuli. (Note: Abul Fath Muhammad Ma'sum Khan) It was repaired from ruins in the 1980s by the Department of Archaeology, and is now a protected monument.

== History ==
The mosque constructed in 1582 (989 AH), is one of the earliest surviving Mughal monuments in Bengal, alongside the Kherua Mosque in Sherpur, Bogra. A Persian inscription, now preserved at Varendra Research Museum records that the mosque was commissioned by Masum Khan Kabuli, who assumed independence from Mughals and established Chatmohar as capital. Shortly after reconstruction by Department of Archeology, Bangladesh in the 1980's, the roof along with the domes had collapsed. Later, the mosque was renovated again and declared as a protected monument.

== Architecture ==
Built with small, thin latticework bricks similar to the Kherua Mosque in Bogra, the interior of Chatmohar Shahi Mosque is 45 by 22.5 m (148 by 74 ft) and 45 ft (14 m) high. The exterior of the mosque measures 18.14 by 8.23 m (59.5 by 27.0 ft) with 1.98 m (6.5 ft) wall thickness.

== Gallery ==
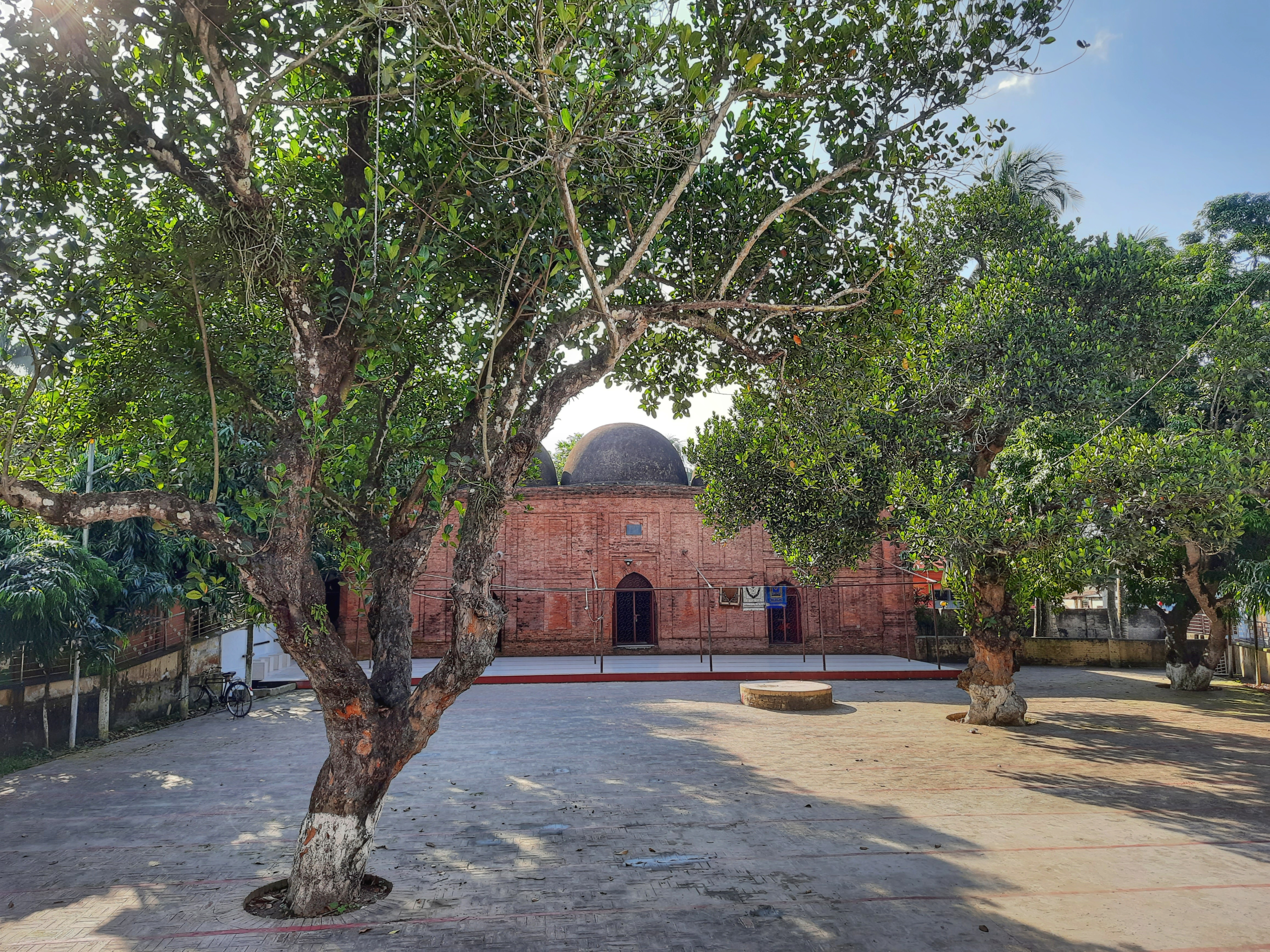
Wide view of the mosque

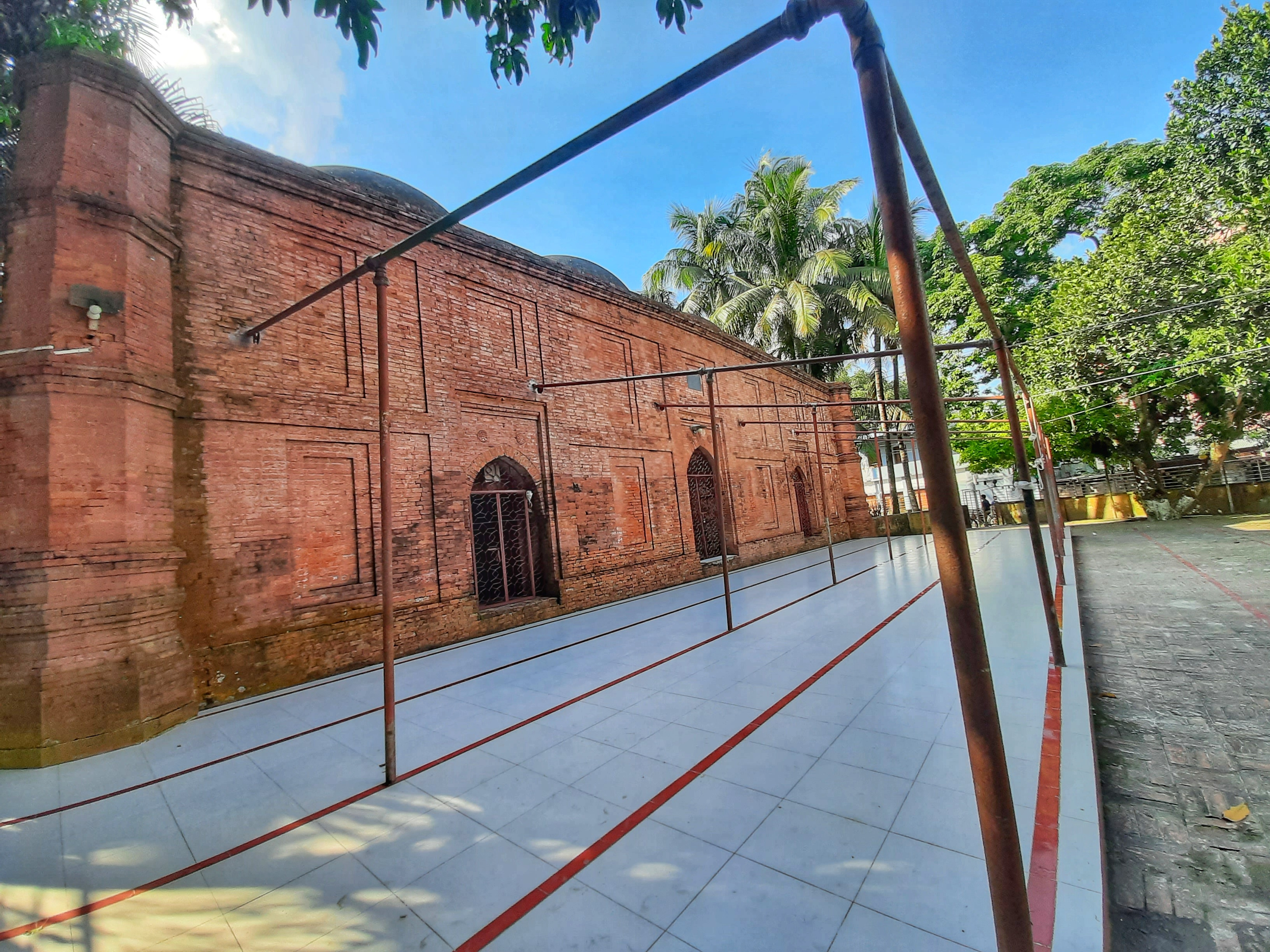
Side view of the mosque

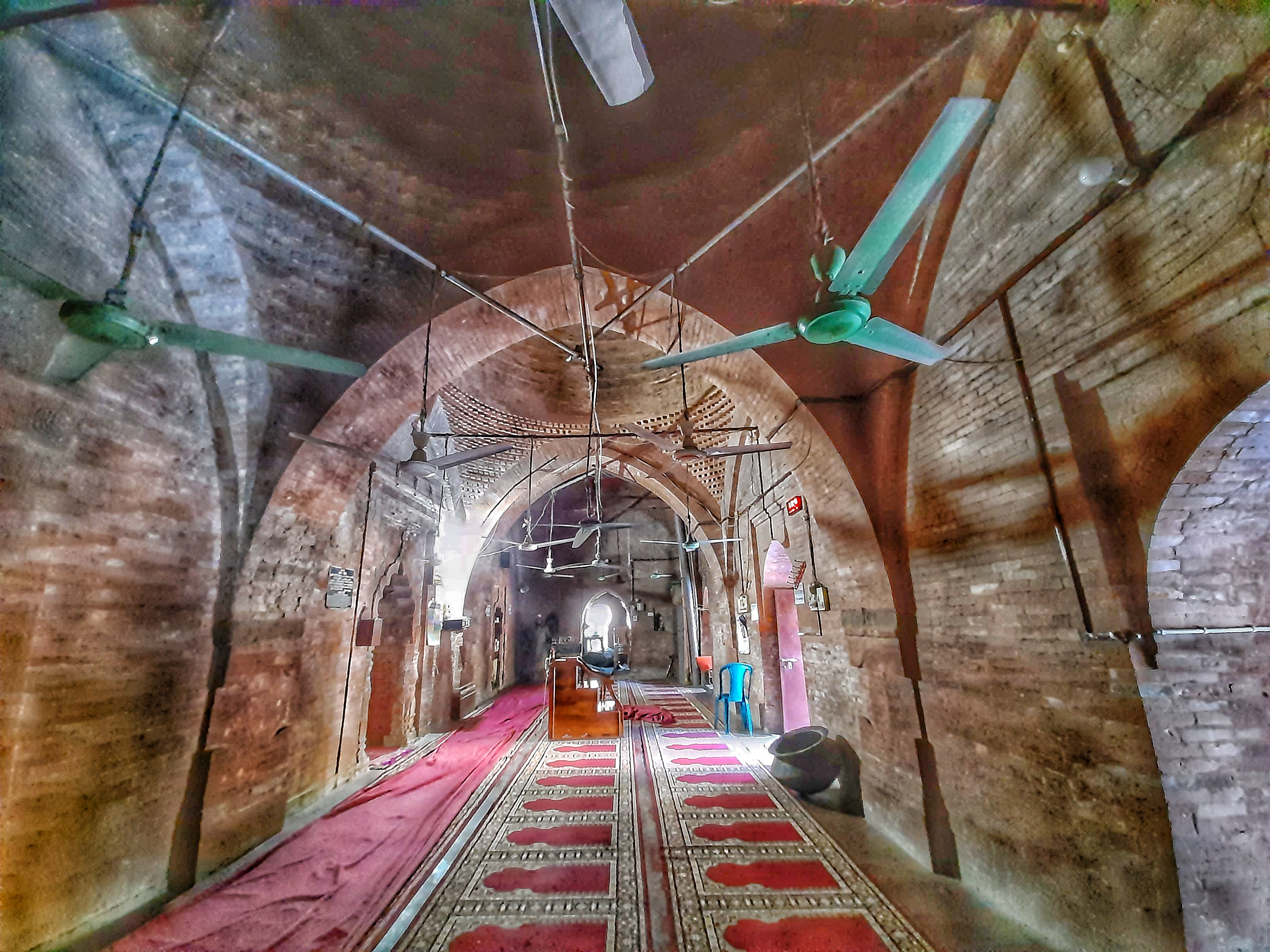
Interior of the Mosque

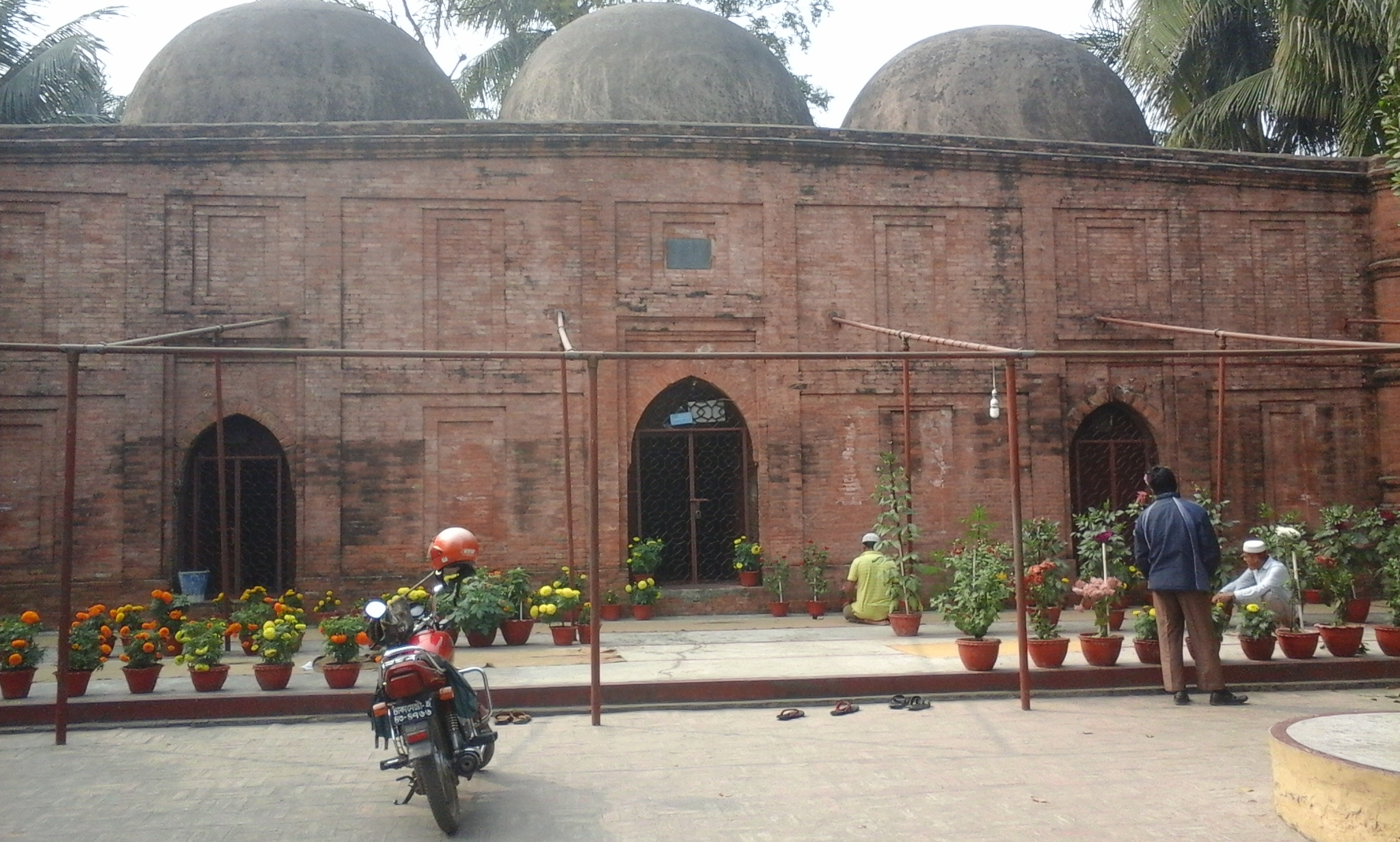
Three domes of the mosque

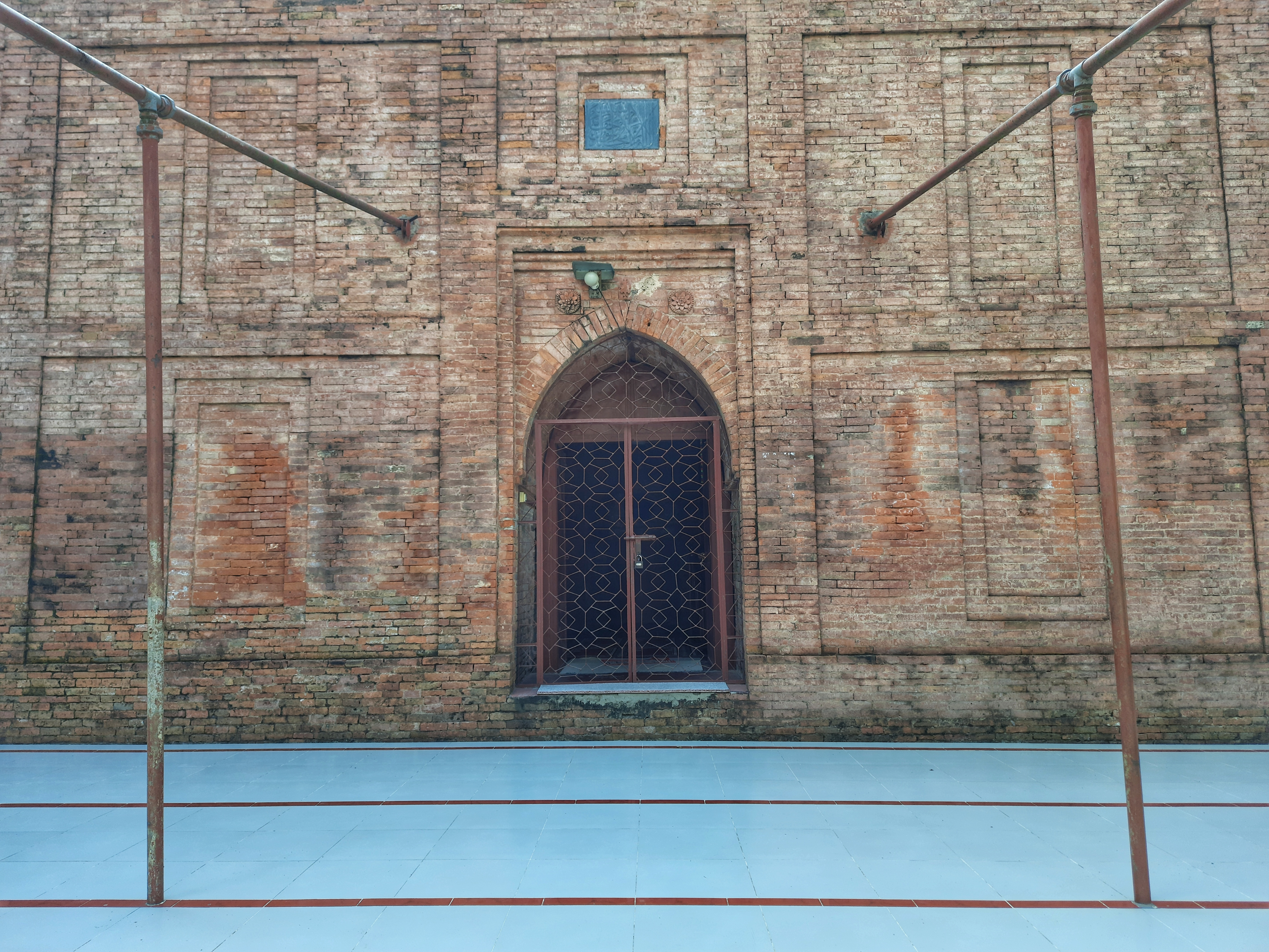
Main entrance

== See also ==
- List of mosques in Bangladesh
- List of archaeological sites in Bangladesh
