= Tapan Raychaudhuri =

British-Indian historian (1926–2014)

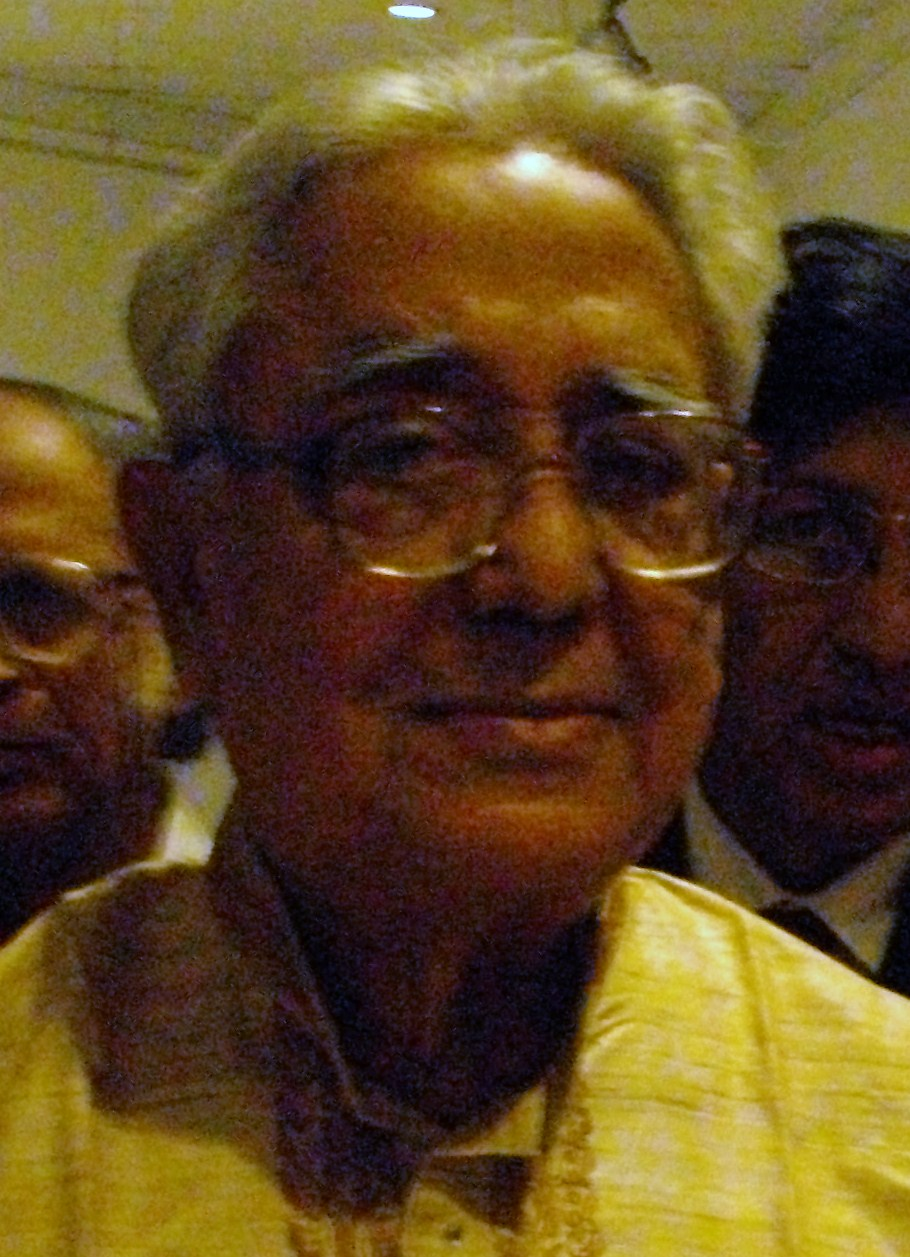
- Raychaudhuri in November 2009
- Born: 8 May 1926; Kirtipasha, Barisal District, Bengal Presidency, British India
- Died: 26 November 2014 (aged 88); Oxford, England
- Education: Barisal Zilla School, Barisal; Scottish Church College, Calcutta; Presidency College, Calcutta; Balliol College, Oxford; Delhi School of Economics; St. Antony's College, Oxford
- Awards: Watumull Prize
- Scientific career
- Fields: History
- Doctoral advisors: Dr. C. C. Davies; Jadunath Sarkar
- Notable students: Gyanendra Pandey, Gowher Rizvi, Rudrangshu Mukherjee

Tapan Raychaudhuri (8 May 1926 – 26 November 2014) was a British-Indian historian specializing in British Indian history, Indian economic history and the History of Bengal.

== Early life and education ==
He was the son of Prativa and Amiya Kumar Raychaudhuri, the last zamindar of Kirtipasha in Barisal district of eastern Bengal. He came from a well-known Bengali Baidya family. He was a nephew of Kiran Shankar Roy and Hem Chandra Raychaudhuri, through his paternal aunts.

He was a student of Ballygunge Government High School, Calcutta and Barisal Zilla School, Scottish Church College, Calcutta, where he completed his I.A. and finally Presidency College, Calcutta, where he completed his B.A. (Hons.) in history with a high first class. He completed his first D.Phil. in History at Calcutta University on Bengal Under Akbar and Jahangir under the supervision of Sir Jadunath Sarkar, who was his Additional Supervisor and his second D.Phil. at Balliol College, Oxford, under the supervision of Major (Dr.) C.C. Davies on the trading activities of the Dutch East India Company, which was later published as Jan Company in Coromandel.

== Career ==
He started his career as a lecturer at the Department of Islamic History and Culture, Calcutta University. After his return from Britain, he became a deputy director of the National Archives of India. He was a reader and then professor of history and director of the Delhi School of Economics and professor and the head of the department of history of Delhi University. He was a key figure in setting up the journal, Indian Economic and Social History Review.

He was a reader in modern South Asian history from 1973 to 1993 and then ad hominem professor of Indian history and civilization and fellow of St. Antony's College, Oxford, from 1992 to 1993. He was an emeritus fellow of St. Antony's College, Oxford, after retirement. He also served on the inaugural Social Sciences jury for the Infosys Prize in 2009.

He became a National Research Professor in India in 2011.

== Awards ==
- Watumull Prize awarded by the American Historical Association, 1982. (jointly with Irfan Habib) for the Cambridge Economic History of India.
- Doctor of Letters 1993, University of Oxford
- Doctor of Letters honoris causa by the University of Calcutta
- Doctor of Letters honoris causa by the University of Burdwan
- Padma Bhushan in 2007 in recognition to his contributions to history.

== Death ==
He died at home in Oxford (England) on 26 November 2014, after suffering a stroke.

== Publications ==
=== Books ===
- —— (1953). Bengal Under Akbar and Jahangir: An Introductory Study in Social History. Calcutta: A. Mukherjee & Co. OCLC 906328391.
- —— (1962). Jan Company in Coromandel, 1605-1690. 's-Gravenhage: Martinus Nijhoff. OCLC 450671.
- Raychaudhuri, Tapan; Habib, Irfan, eds. (1982). The Cambridge Economic History of India. Vol. I, c. 1200-c. 1750. Cambridge, England: Cambridge University Press. ISBN 978-0-521-22802-2.
- —— (1988). Europe Reconsidered: Perceptions of the West in Nineteenth Century Bengal. New Delhi: Oxford University Press. ISBN 978-0-19-562066-5.
- —— (1993). Romanthan Athoba Bhimrotiprapter Paracharitcharcha রোমন্থন অথবা ভীমরতিপ্রাপ্তর পরচরিতচর্চা (in Bengali). Kolkata: Ananda. ISBN 978-8177563481.
- —— (2005). Perceptions, Emotions, Sensibilities: Essays on India's Colonial and Post-colonial Experiences. New Delhi: Oxford University Press. ISBN 978-0-19-567894-9.
- —— (2007). Bangalanama. Kolkata: Ananda. ISBN 978-8177566697.
- —— (2011). The world in our time: a memoir. Noida: Harper Collins Publishers India. ISBN 978-9350291320.
