= Lohagarh Math =

Hindu temple in Bangladesh

- লোহাগড় মঠ
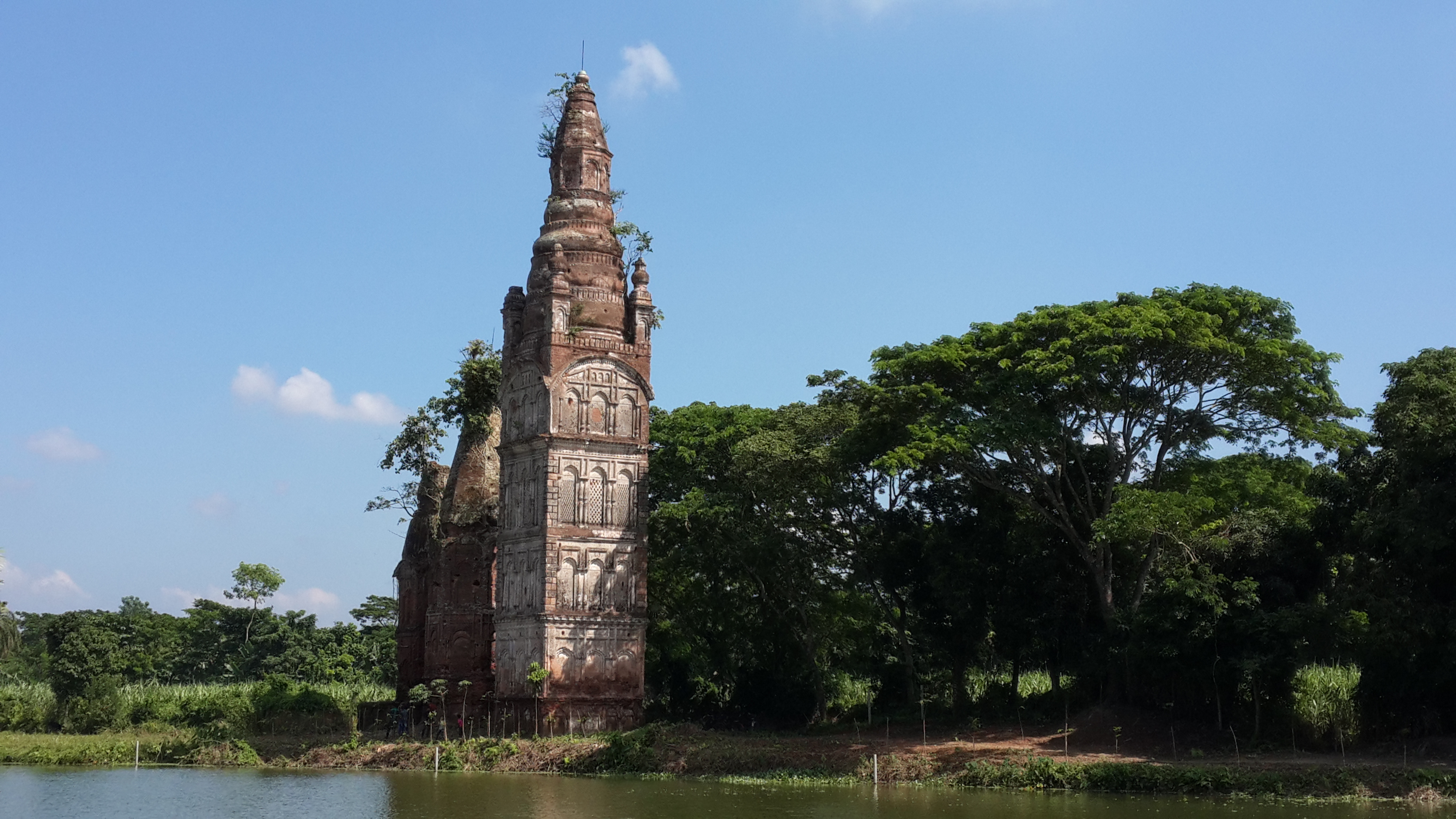
- Lohagarh Math in Faridganj, Chandpur

- Location in Bangladesh

Religion
- Affiliation: Hinduism
- District: Chandpur District

Location
- Location: Lohagarh village, Faridganj Upazila
- Country: Bangladesh
- Interactive map of Lohagarh Math

Architecture
- Type: Traditional Bengali temple architecture
- Completed: 14th–17th century (approx.)

Lohagarh Math (Bengali: লোহাগড় মঠ) is a historic temple located in Lohagarh village, Faridganj Upazila, Chandpur District, Bangladesh. The temple is situated near the Dakatia River.

== Etymology ==
The name "Lohagarh" comes from the names of two influential brothers, Louh and Gororh, who were prominent figures in the region.

== History ==
The temple was part of the Lohagarh zamindars’ estate, where judicial and administrative activities were conducted. Local accounts mention that the zamindars were authoritarian rulers, and even British officials noted the influence they wielded over the local population.

== Current status ==
Today, the site remains a symbol of the historical significance of the region. It continues to attract visitors and researchers interested in the legacy of the historical zamindar family.

== See also ==
- Chandpur
- Hinduism in Bangladesh
- List of archaeological sites in Bangladesh
