= Bhajahari Lodge =

General information
- Location: Dhaka, Bangladesh

Bhajahari Lodge is a protected early 20th century mansion in Tipu Sultan Road, Dhaka, Bangladesh.

It was built by Bhajahari Saha Banik around 1925. Although it was primarily a residence, Bhajahari and his brother Lal Mohan Saha founded a theatre company, and dramas were often performed there.

Bhajahari Lodge is a blend of Indian and Gothic architecture. The principal facade is two storeys high, 150 feet (46 m) long, and symmetrical. The main entrance is through a trefoil arch in the middle. On the second floor are three oriel windows, the two on either side capped with half domes. The oriel window above the main entrance has a conical top, and a gabled roof rises above. An incompatible western block was added later. The forecourt had an ornamental fountain that has been lost.

The lodge is on the Department of Archaeology's list of protected monuments. However its users, Government Shaheed Suhrawardy College and Graduates High School, want it demolished.

== See also ==
- List of archaeological sites in Bangladesh
