= Khan Mohammad Mridha Mosque =

Mosque in Dhaka, Bangladesh

Khan Mohammad Mirza Mosque
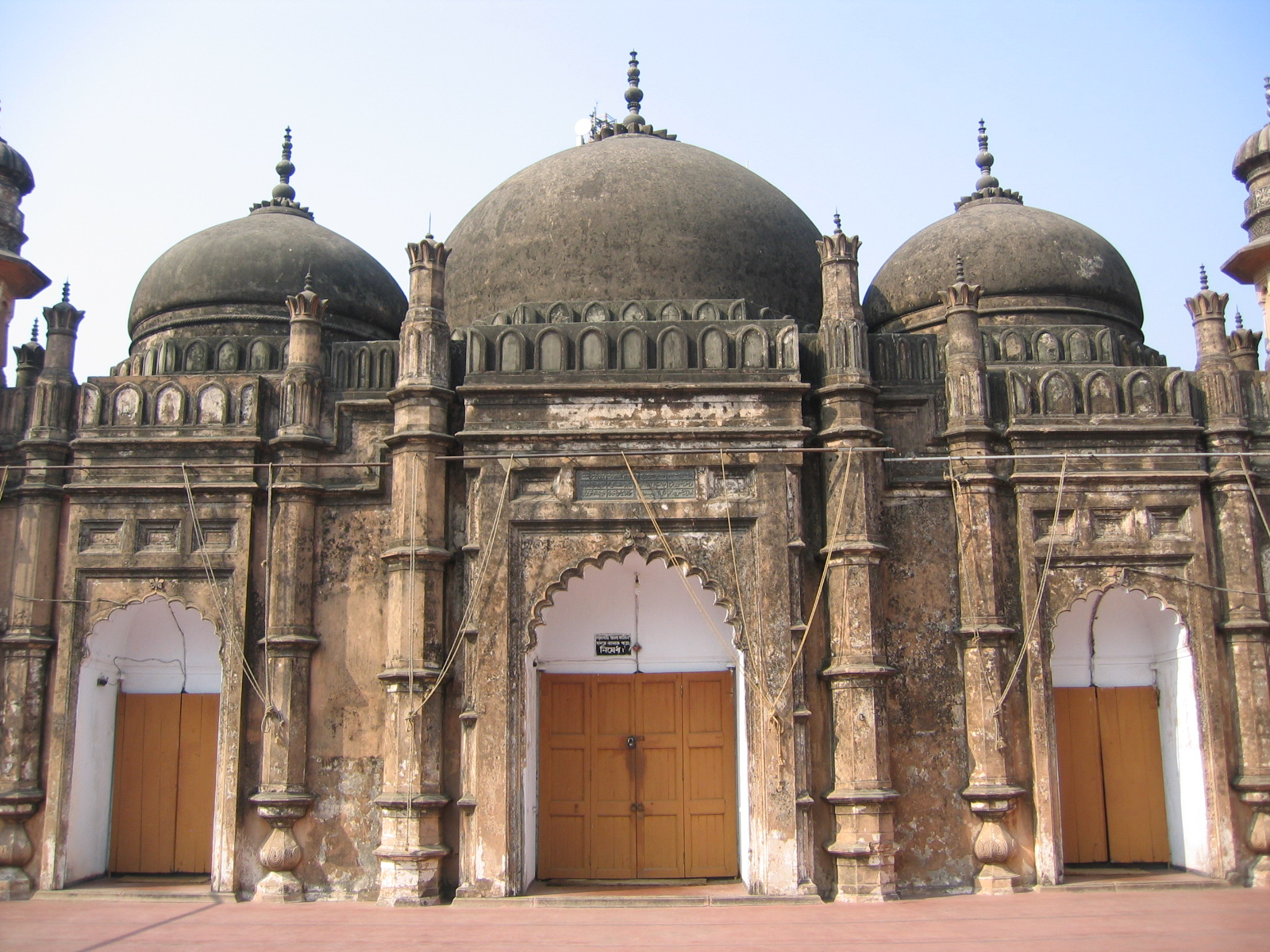

- Location within Dhaka

Religion
- Affiliation: Sunni Islam
- Sect: Hanafi
- Ecclesiastical or organisational status: Mosque
- Status: Active

Location
- Location: near Lalbagh Fort, Dhaka
- Country: Bangladesh
- Coordinates: 23°43′14″N 90°23′07″E

Architecture
- Completed: 1706 CE
- Dome: Three (maybe more)

The Khan Mohammad Mirdha Mosque is a historical mosque near Lalbagh Fort in Dhaka, Bangladesh.

== History ==
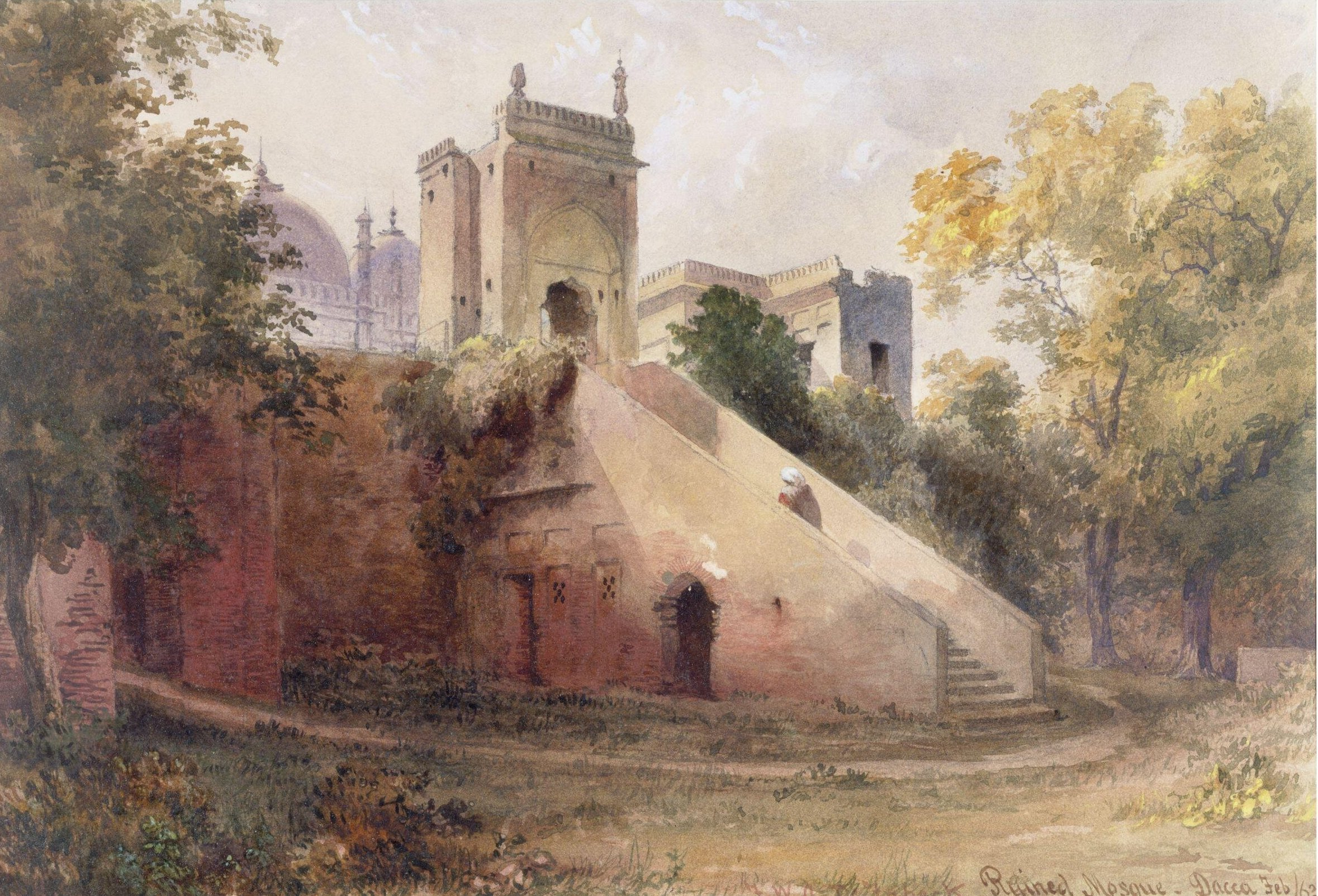
1863 Painting by Frederick William Alexander de Fabeck

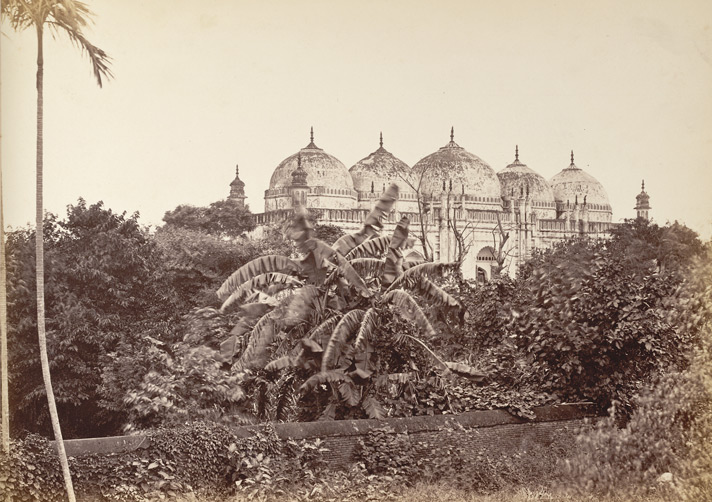
1885 photograph by Johnston and Hoffman

The mosque was built in Atish Khan Mahalla by Khan Mohammad Mirdha under the instruction of Qadi Ibadullah in 1706 CE. The mosque rises above its surroundings because the tahkhana or underground rooms of the mosque are above grade. The roof of the tahkhana forms the platform on which the mosque is situated. The spacious prayer place before the main mosque is open in all directions allowing air to flow and keep the Musullis cool.

A madrasa was also built north-west of the mosque building. Its founding teacher, Mawlana Asadullah (d. 1709), taught fiqh, philosophy and logic in the Arabic and Persian languages to the pupils, and was funded by the Nawabs of Bengal.

== Architecture ==
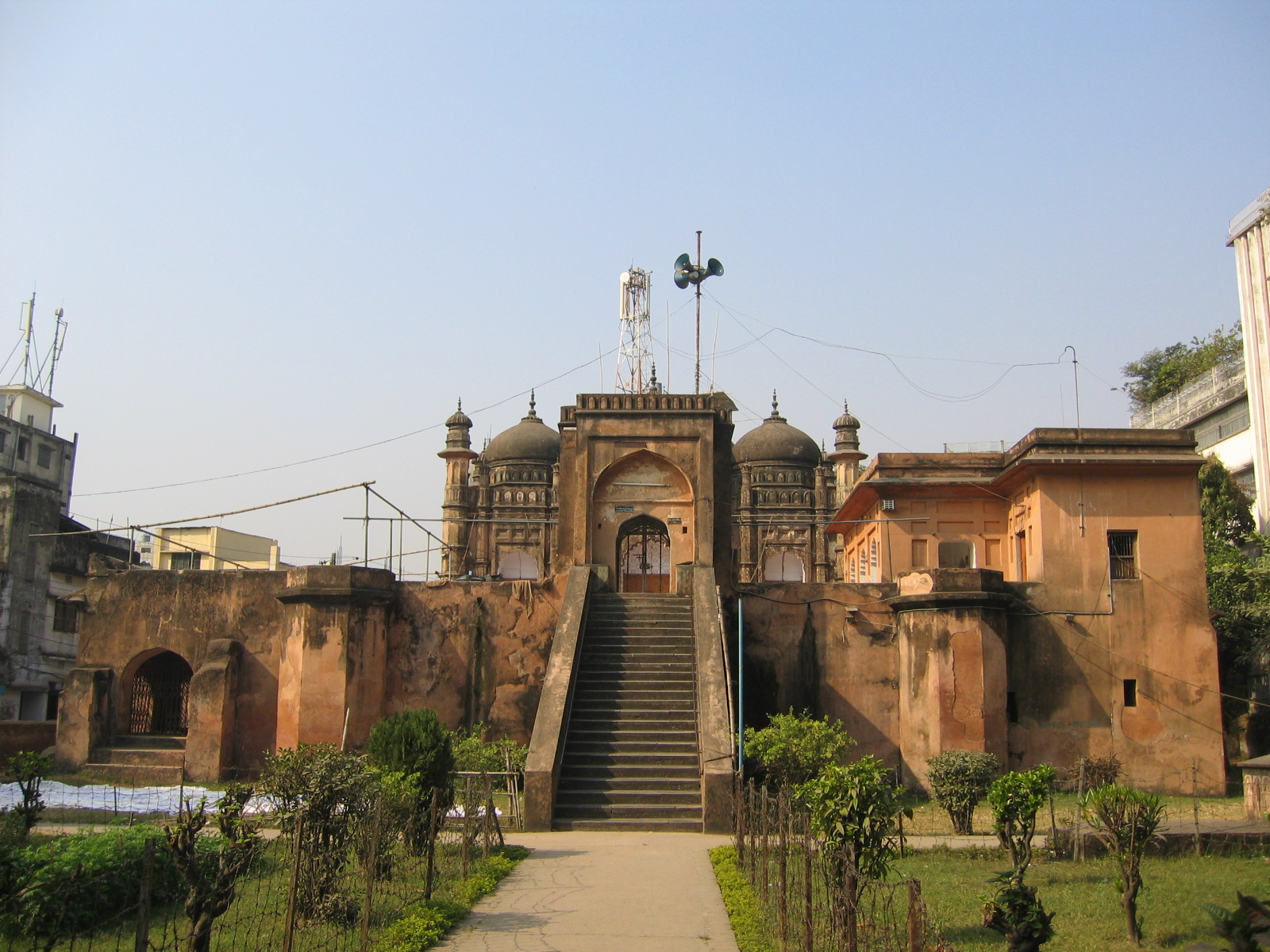
The domes on the mosque

The main mosque, where the Imam and a few Musullis are accommodated, consists of three domes and bears testimony of the architecture practiced during the sixteenth century. Two Persian inscriptions, one over the central archway and the other over the central Mihrab. According to an inscription found, the mosque was built during the rule of Deputy Governor of Dhaka, Farrukhsiyar, by a Khan Muhammad Mirza, who could have been the architect. The construction was ordered by a Qazi Ibadullah during 1704–05 AD.

The platform is 16'-6" above the ground level. The tahkhana comprises vaulted rooms for living purposes. The mosque is accessed from the east, up a flight of twenty-five steps. Area wise, the mosque occupies only a small portion of the platform.

=== Prayer hall ===
The prayer hall is a rectangular structure measuring 48' x 24' and is capped by three domes, the central being the larger one. The smaller sizes of the side domes are achieved by using intermediary pendentives. The corner minarets are short and slender, rising just above the parapet and are capped by ribbed cupolas. The annex to the north of the mosque serves as a madrasa or religious school and has a hujra or arcaded hall that is used for travelers and visitors. The facade of the mosque is decorated with paneling and ornamental merlons along the parapet. The entrances to the prayer hall are framed by multi-cusped arches and engaged columns on either side.

=== Interior ===
The interior is divided into three bays by two lateral arches. Each bay contains a mihrab that is marked by a multi-cusped arch within a rectangular panel.

=== Gardens ===
Various kinds of seasonal flowers are cultivated in the garden in the eastern portion making the compound a sight for sore eyes. A gardener appointed by the Department of Archaeology is in charge of the upkeep of the garden. A well in the northern portion of the garden, once used for supplying water for ablution (wudu in Arabic), a way of becoming fresh before prayer is now abandoned. In the southern side of the garden stands a tall, old palm tree bearing the symbol of ancient for the place.

=== Restoration and controversies ===
In 1913, the Archaeological Survey of India listed Mirza's Masjid as a historic monument; by then it had undergone alterations and appropriations that had to be demolished to restore it to its original form. The earliest photograph available on the mosque shows a ruined structure at the turn of the nineteenth century just before this early restoration attempt. Thereafter both the DOA and mosque committee have undertaken periodic repairs, some of which ignored the architectural and historic importance of the building. To compensate for the damaged drains and stop further deterioration, the authority provided new outlets to drain rainwater out from the upper terrace (sahn); and improved water and sanitation services. The site experienced many encroachments that constricted the boundaries of the compound, which drew serious attention of the architects and other conservation enthusiasts when it was included as a case study in an architectural conservation workshop in 1989 in Dhaka, sponsored by the AKTC and UNDP.

==== Conservation and criticism ====
Conservation of invaluable heritage sites in the 400-year-old city of Dhaka has always been ignored, leading to destruction of the sites. Destruction of heritage sites and historical monuments started during Pakistan period on a moderate scale but it gained momentum after independence. Heritage properties suffered destruction in an appalling extent during military rule. According to conservationist architects, friezes and other ornamental features of the old buildings are replaced with dissimilar and odd-looking features. Details of the ornamental works, their sizes and proportions are lost in the intervention. Though the Bangladesh National Building Code (BNBC), the Metropolitan Building Rules of 2006 (revised in 2008) and the Antiquities Act of 1968 require the government to take measures and institute a standing committee to protect the heritage sites, the government has all along been idle on the issue.

== Location and ownership ==
This ancient structure can be beheld at 150 meters west on the road that goes beside Lalbag fort. The mosque, other than being an architectural site of Dhaka city, is also used as a mosque. Mutawalli of the mosque says, "Though the mosque is owned by the government as an archeological site and is being supervised by the Department of Archeology under Ministry of Cultural affairs there is lack of sincerity and transparency in the government intervention."

== See also ==
- Islam in Bangladesh
- List of mosques in Bangladesh
- List of archaeological sites in Bangladesh
