= Dakkhindihi =

Village in Bangladesh

Coordinates: 22.9891°N 89.4597°E

Dakkhindihi is a village under Fultala Union Parishad of Phultala Upazila of Khulna district of Bangladesh. The village is about 19 km from Khulna city. Tagore family had a close connection with Dakkhindihi village. It was Rabindranath Tagore's maternal ancestral village. Besides poets mother Sarada Sundari Devi; poets Grandmother Digambari Devi, poets wife Mrinalini Devi and paternal aunt by marriage Tripura Sundari Devi were from this village. In British India; Fultala Union Parishad was a single village named Fultala village and was under Khulna district of then Jessore Mohakuma. Young Tagore used to visit Dakkhindihi village with his mother to visit his maternal uncles; in his mothers ancestral home. The residence of Tagore's father-in-law, Beni Madhab Roy Chowdhury in this village now conserved as a museum named Dakkhindihi Rabindra complex. Tagore visited this Village several times in his lifetime.
