= Rabindra Complex =

Coordinates: 22.9897°N 89.4597°E

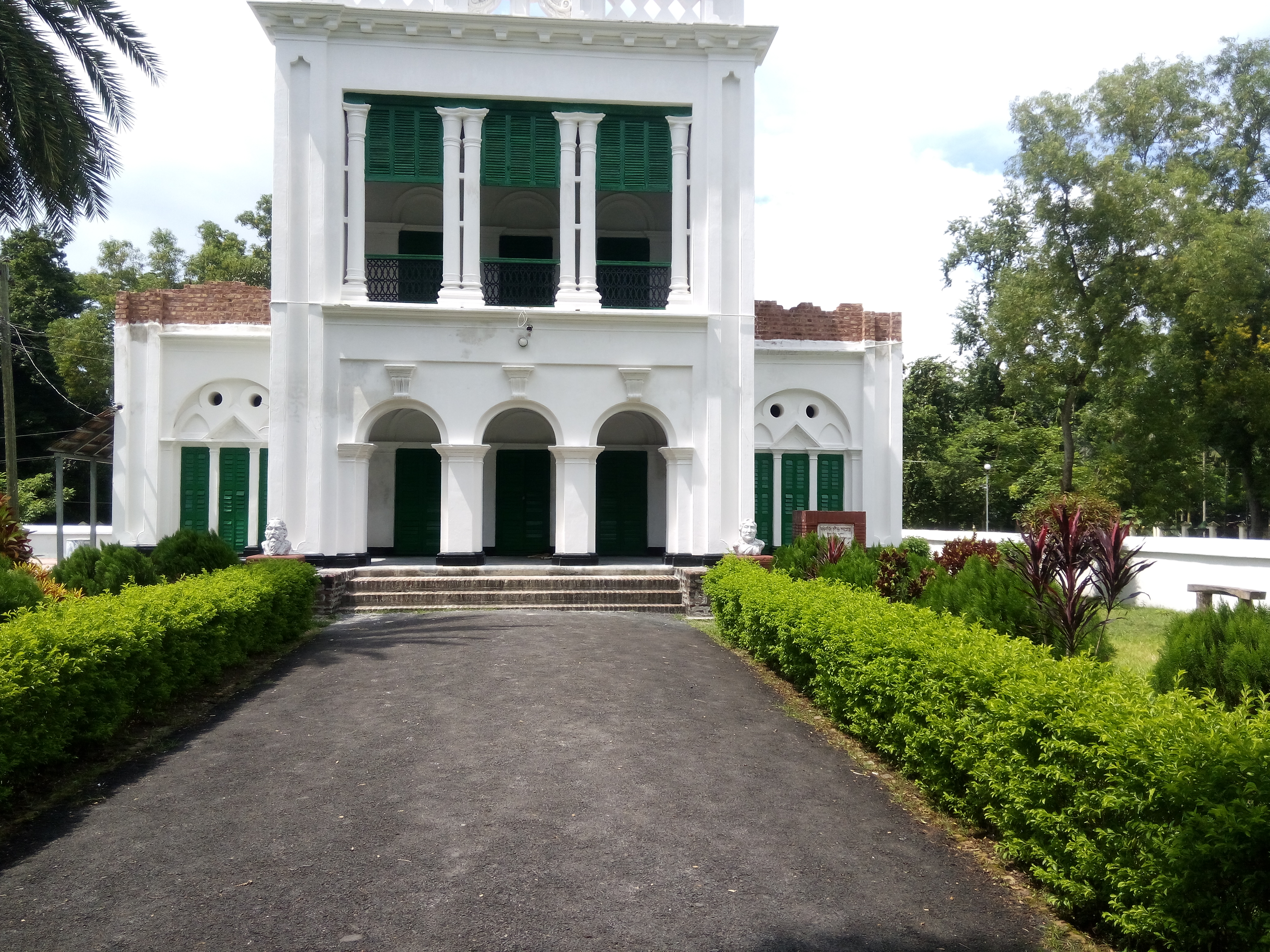
Front entrance

Rabindra Complex is located in Dakkhindihi village, Fultala Union Parishad, Phultala Upazila, 19 km from Khulna city, Bangladesh. It was the residence of Rabindranath Tagore's father-in-law, Beni Madhab Roy Chowdhury. In British India, Fultala Union Parishad was a single village named Fultala village and was under Jessore district of then Khulna Mohakuma. Tagore family had close connection with Dakkhindihi village. The maternal ancestral home of the poet was also situated at Dakkhindihi village, poets mother Sarada Sundari Devi and his paternal aunt by marriage Tripura Sundari Devi; was born in this village. Not only that his grandmother Digambari Devi also was from Dakkhindihi. Young Tagore used to visit Dakkhindihi village with his mother to visit his maternal uncles in her mothers ancestral home. Tagore visited this place several times in his life. It has been declared as a protected archaeological site by Department of Archaeology of Bangladesh and converted into a museum.

Gyanadanandini Devi was Rabindranath's sister in law and was the wife of his brother Satyendranath. She had very close relation with her brother-in-law Rabindranath. During the 1882 Puja Vacation, Gyanadanandini Devi went to Narendrapur in Jessore to visit her Ancestral home, but the main purpose was to search for a bride from nearby pirali Brahmin family. With Gyanadanandini Devi, Kadambi Devi, Balika Indrani, Balak Surendra Nath and Rabindranath also came to see the old Vita. From there they went to Fultala (Dakkhindihi) to visit the bride, the daughter of Binimadhab Roy Chowdhury; Bhabratini. At age 22, Rabindranath married Bhabratini on 9 December 1883 at Jorosanko. Later she was introduced as Mrinalini Devi. It is assumed that the father of Mrinalini was involved in supervising the business of the Tagore family.

According to Rabindranath's biographer Prasanta Kumar Paul's Rabindra Jiboni (The Life of Rabindranath), Rabindranath married Mrinalini Devi on 9 December 1883. His father-in-law Benimadhab Roy Choudhury, a landlord from Jessore, lived in Kolkata. His son Narendranath Roy Choudhury, better known as Felu Babu, would visit their lands in Dakkhindihi. Felu Babu's sons stayed at this building prior to partition. Before permanently moving to Kolkata in 1940, Felu Babu and his wife gave their property to a landlord named Bijankrishna Das as an exchange settlement. Naib Nabakumar Mustafi was in charge of the house and property. Bijankrishna Das left the county in 1965. Naib Mustafi's whereabouts are unknown. The house was taken over by others; 7 September 1995 the two-storey building was recovered from land grabbers. In 1995, the local administration took charge of the house and on 14 November of that year, the Rabindra Complex project was decided. Bangladesh Governments Department of Archeology has carried out the renovation work to make the house a museum titled 'Rabindra Complex' in 2011-12 fiscal year.

The two-storey museum building has four rooms on the first floor and two rooms on the ground floor at present. The building has eight windows on the ground floor and 21 windows on the first floor. The height of the roof from the floor on the ground floor is 13 feet. There are seven doors, six windows and wall almirahs on the first floor. Over 500 books were kept in the library and all the rooms have been decorated with rare pictures of Rabindranath. Over 10,000 visitors come here every year to see the museum from different parts of the country and also from abroad, said Saifur Rahman, assistant director of the Department of Archeology in Khulna. A bust of Rabindranath Tagore is also there. Every year on 25-27 Baishakh (after the Bengali New Year Celebration), cultural programs are held here which lasts for three days.

== See also ==
- List of archaeological sites in Bangladesh
