= Pathrail Mosque =

Mosque in Faridpur, Bangladesh

- পাতরাইল মসজিদ
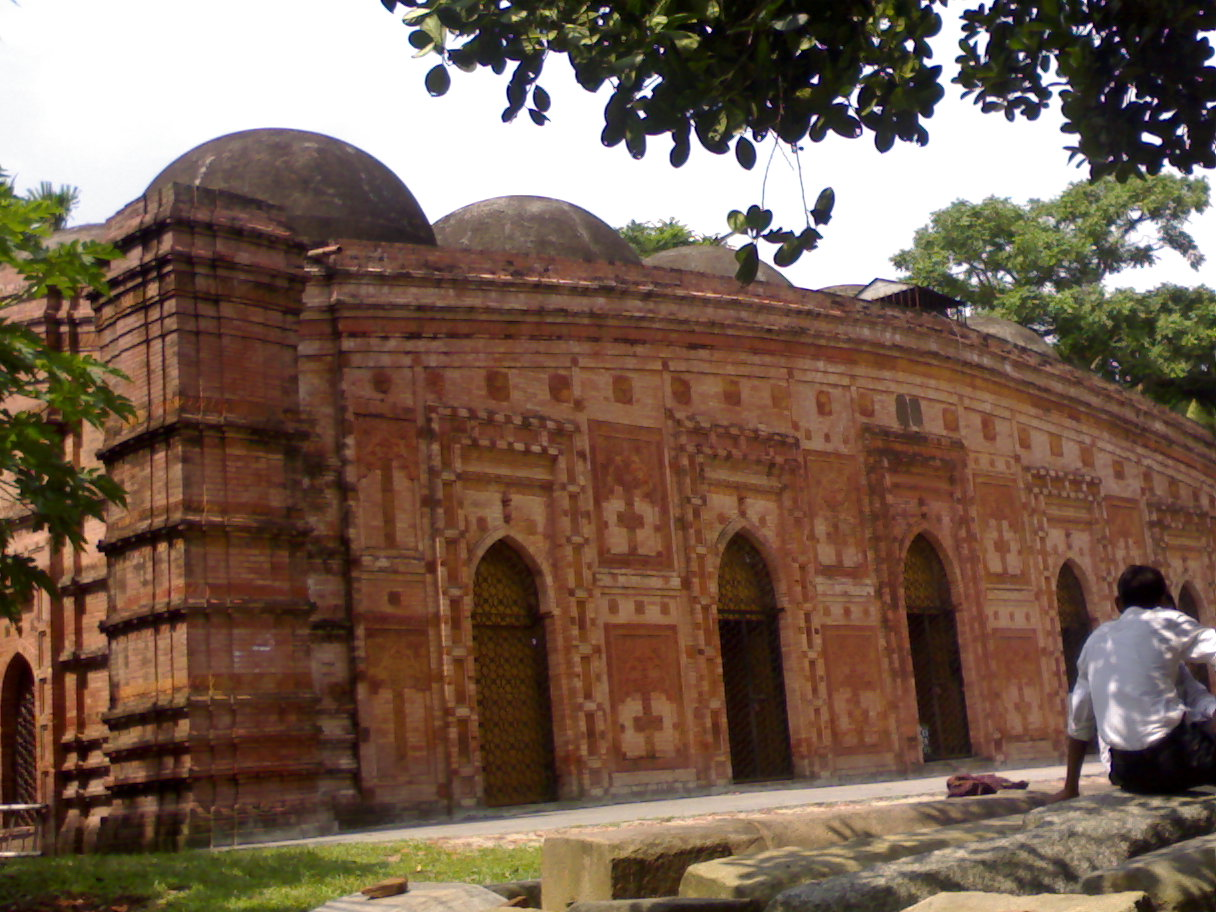

- Location of the mosque in Bangladesh

Religion
- Affiliation: Islam
- Ecclesiastical or organisational status: Mosque
- Status: Active

Location
- Location: Bhanga Upazila, Faridpur District
- Country: Bangladesh
- Administration: Department of Archaeology
- Coordinates: 23°20′29″N 90°05′22″E

Architecture
- Type: Mosque architecture
- Style: Indo-Islamic; Bengal Sultanate
- Founder: Ghiyasuddin Azam Shah
- Completed: 15th century

Specifications
- Length: 21.79 m (71.5 ft)
- Width: 8.6 m (28 ft)
- Height (max): 6.5 m (21 ft)
- Dome: Ten
- Minaret: Four
- Site area: 13.01 ha (32.15 acres)
- Materials: Brick; concrete

The Pathrail Mosque (Bengali: পাথরাইল মসজিদ), also known as Majlis Aulia Mosque (Arabic: مسجد مجلس أولياء), is a mosque located in the Bhanga Upazila, in the Faridpur District of Bangladesh. The mosque is situated 4 kilometres (2.5 mi) south from Polia, which is 8 kilometres (5.0 mi) east by the Bhanga-Mawa highway from 'Bhanga Square' associated with Faridpur-Barishal highway from Faridpur District.

== History ==
The Pathrail Mosque was built during the reign of the Sultan of Bengal, Ghiyasuddin Azam Shah, between 1393 and 1410 (or 1493–1519). It is currently known as 'Majlis Aulia Mosque', and shortly 'Awlia Mosque'. The mosque is adjacent to the mazar of Majlis Abdullah Khan, a medieval Muslim preacher.

== Construction ==
The architectural design of Pathrail Mosque is similar to the Choto Sona Mosque and Bagha Mosque of Rajshahi and identified the Shahi dynasty by the Department of Archaeology, Bangladesh.

The historical Pathrail Mosque is rectangular shaped. There are ten domes with the same height arranged over the roof supporting by the inside vim. The roof is lightly curved like nail. Five outlet doorways are in the east and two each in the north and west side. Four pillars are in the corner to strengthen the wall and same quantity pillars are separately stand inside of the structure and divided the floor in two aisles. Each wall is 2 metres (6 ft 7 in) wide and the prayer hall occupies 21.79 by 8.6 metres (71.5 by 28.2 ft). The maximum height of the mosque is 6.5 metres (21 ft). There are five Mihrabs faced towards the eastern doorways at the opposite side. All the doorway arches look like vault and middle one is bigger showing rectangular projection. Wall of the mosque is ornamented by rectangular terracotta. Varieties of decorative designs are floral scrolls, rosettes, cusped arch motifs, diaper including hanging patterns.

In ancient times, people of this area had poor access to drinking water. A large water tank was completed in the same period, situated beside the mosque, on the 13.01-hectare (32.15-acre) site. Graves of famous Majlish Abdullah Khan and Fakir Solimuddin in the south of the mosque.

== See also ==
- Islam in Bangladesh
- List of mosques in Bangladesh
- List of archaeological sites in Bangladesh
