= Jinn Mosque =

Former mosque in Baku, Azerbaijan

- Azerbaijani: Cin Məscidi; Persian: مسجد جن
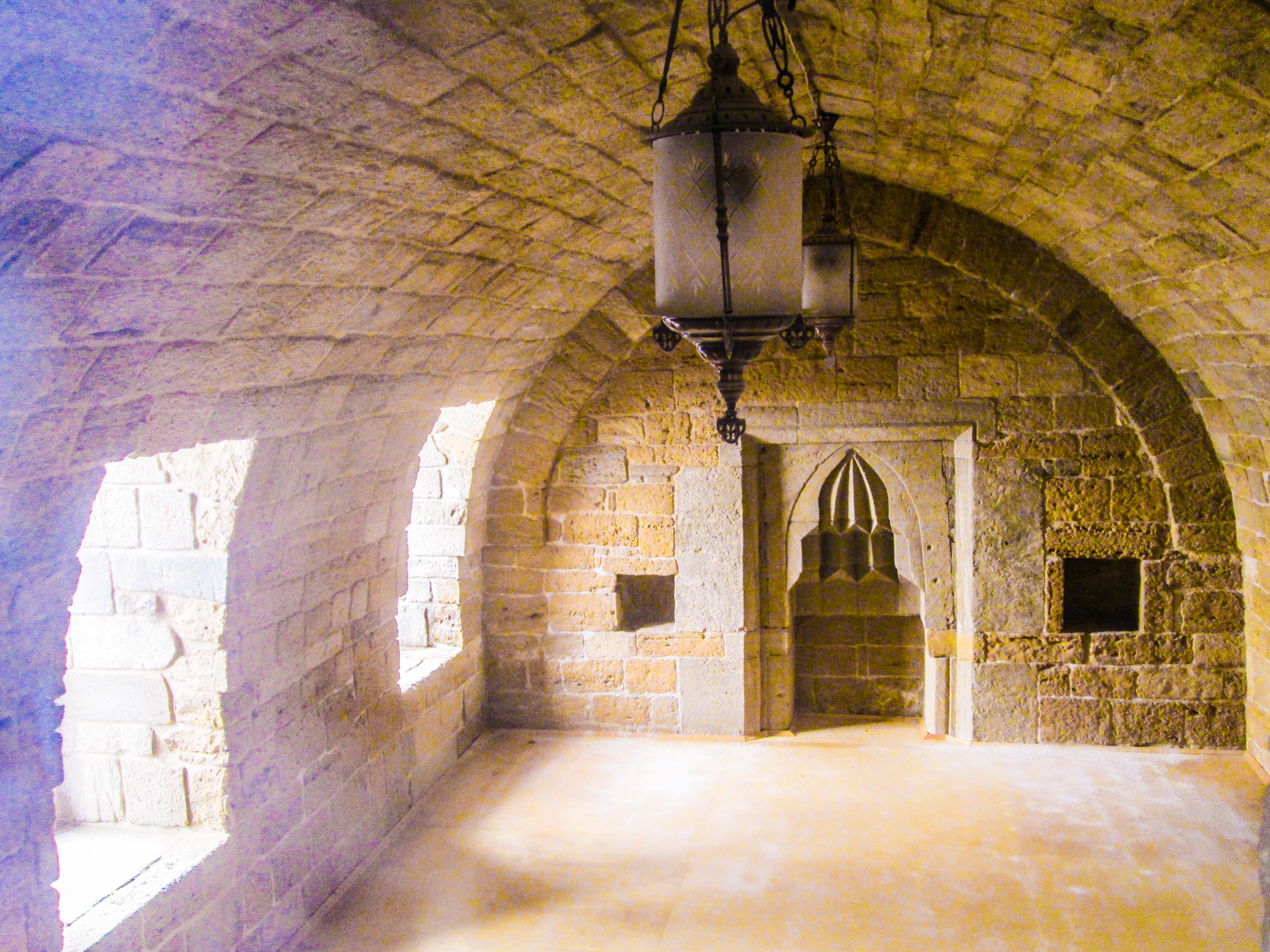
- Interior of the former mosque

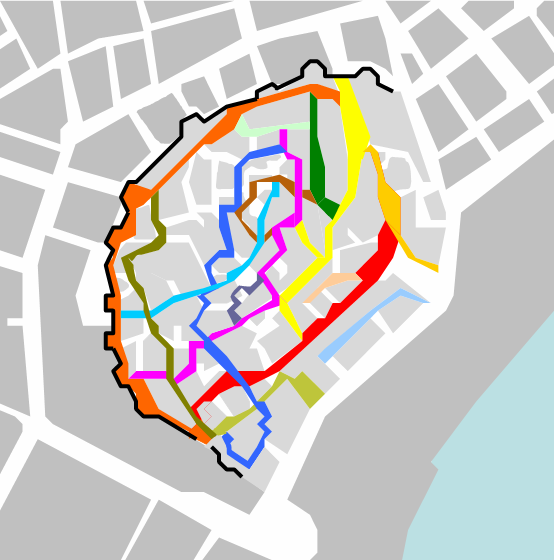
- Location of the former mosque in the Baku Old City

Religion
- Affiliation: Islam (former)
- Ecclesiastical or organizational status: Mosque (14th century–1928); Profane use (1928–1991); Museum (since 2001)
- Status: Abandoned (as a mosque); Restored (as a museum)

Location
- Location: Palace of the Shirvanshahs, Old City, Baku
- Country: Azerbaijan
- Interactive map of Jinn Mosque
- Coordinates: 40°21′58″N 49°50′00″E

Architecture
- Type: Mosque architecture
- Style: Islamic; Shirvan-Absheron
- Completed: 14th century
- Dome: One

UNESCO World Heritage Site
- Official name: Jinn Mosque
- Type: Cultural
- Criteria: iv
- Designated: 2000 (24th session)
- Part of: Walled City of Baku with the Shirvanshah's Palace and Maiden Tower
- Reference no.: 958
- Region: Europe/Asia
- Endangered: 2003–2009

The Jinn Mosque (Azerbaijani: Cin məscidi, Persian: مسجد جن) is a former mosque, located on Gala turn, in the Palace of the Shirvanshahs in the Old City of Baku, in Azerbaijan.

The 14th century former mosque built by the Iranian Shirvanshahs was registered as a national architectural monument by the decision of the Cabinet of Ministers of the Republic of Azerbaijan dated August 2, 2001, No. 132. The Jin Mosque forms part of the UNESCO World Heritage-listed Palace of the Shirvanshahs.

== History ==
The former mosque is located in the lower part of the Eastern Gate. There is no inscription on the façade of the mosque. It is believed that it was built in the 14th century and named after Jinn, a surah in Koran. It was used as a neighborhood mosque.

== Architecture ==
The mosque is in rectangular shape in the plan. It forms a single-cell worshipping hall covered with a pointed stone dome. The five-tiered corbelled mihrab carved into muqarnas is framed with a rectangle on the southern wall of the interior and forms certain motifs of architectural school of Shirvan-Absheron as a whole. Small niches were placed at the edges.

The main façade of the mosque is asymmetrical and its rigid, voluminous composition is emphasized with classic styled portal-entrance. The portal of the mosque is classical-type.

== Gallery ==
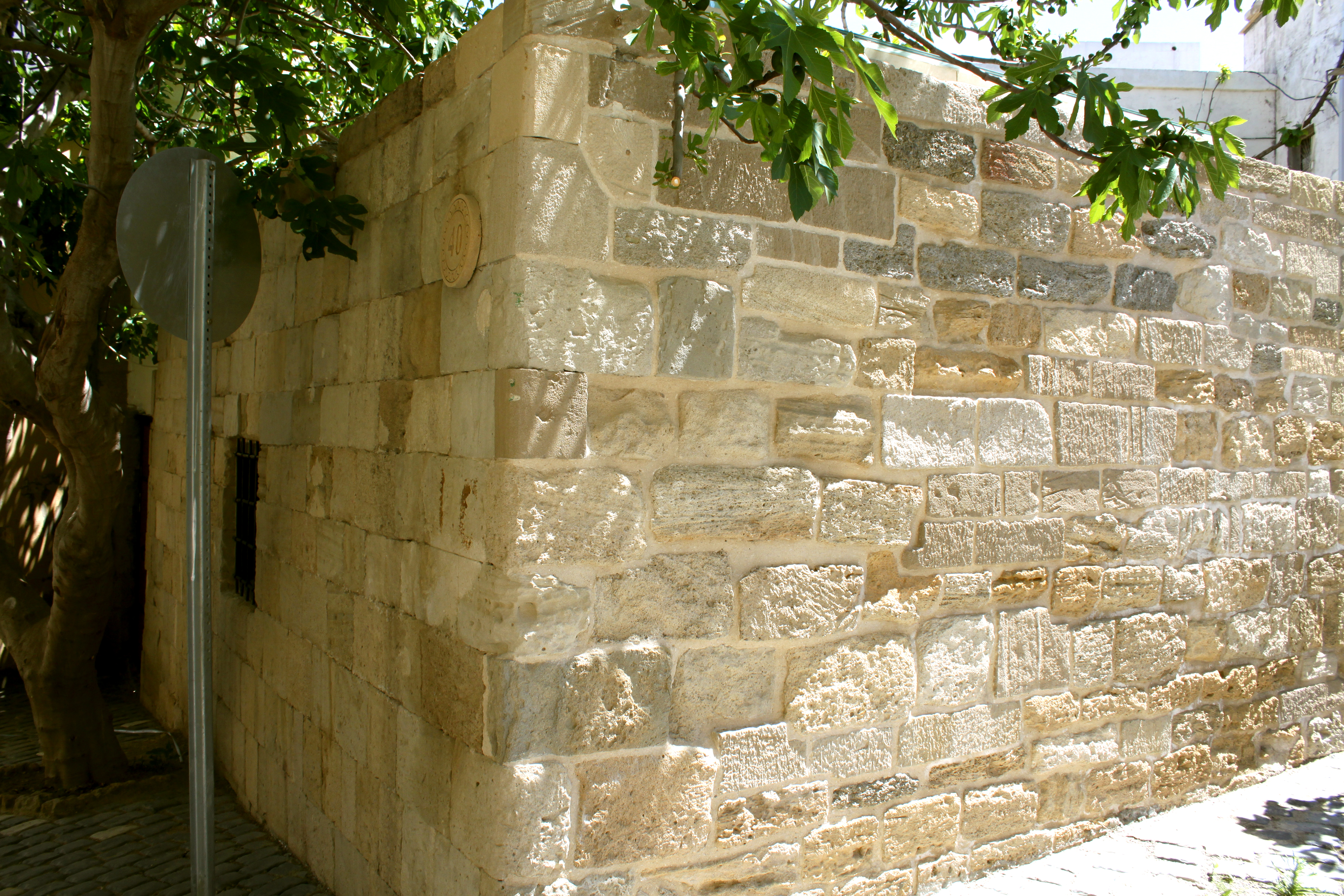

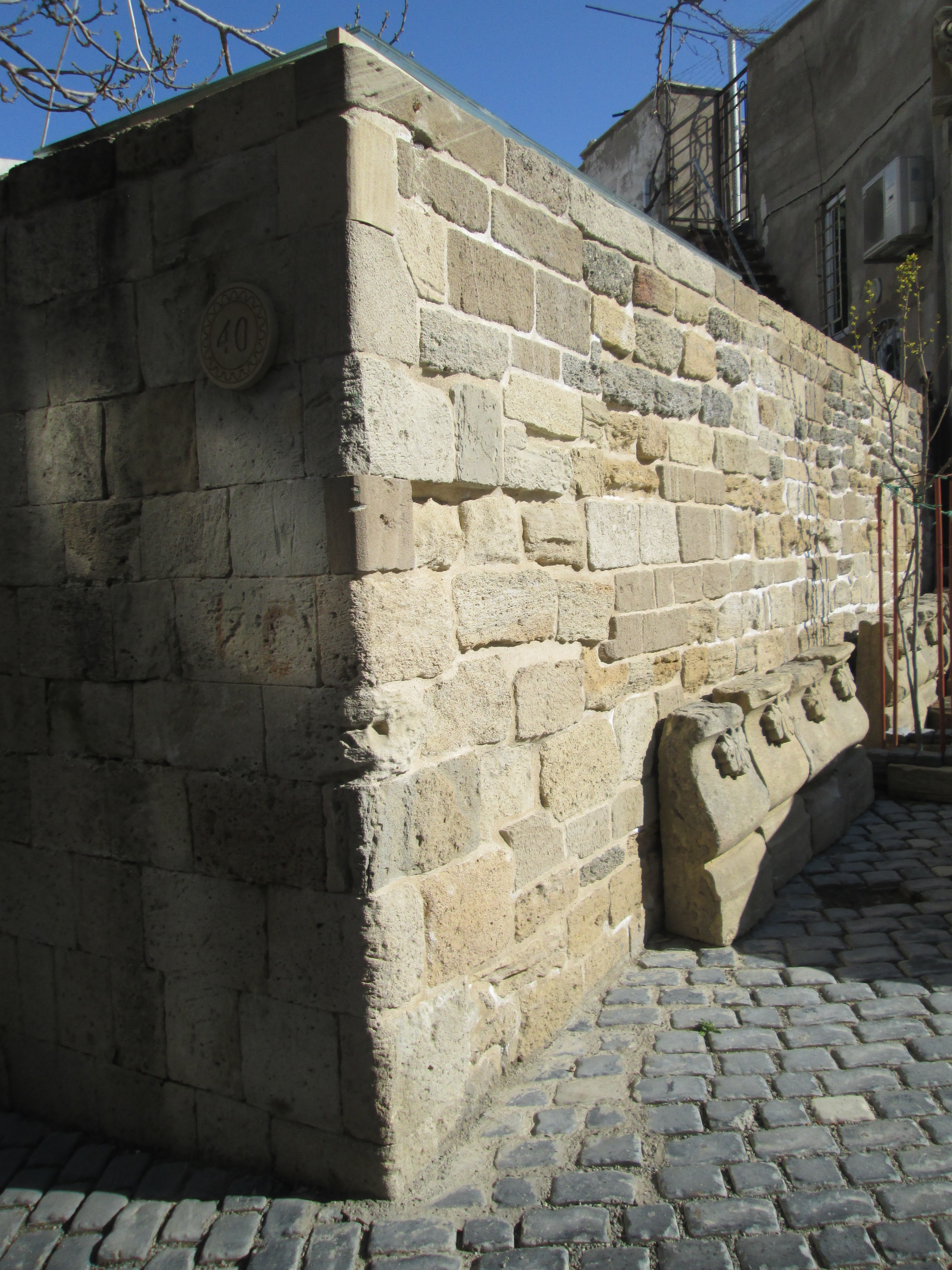

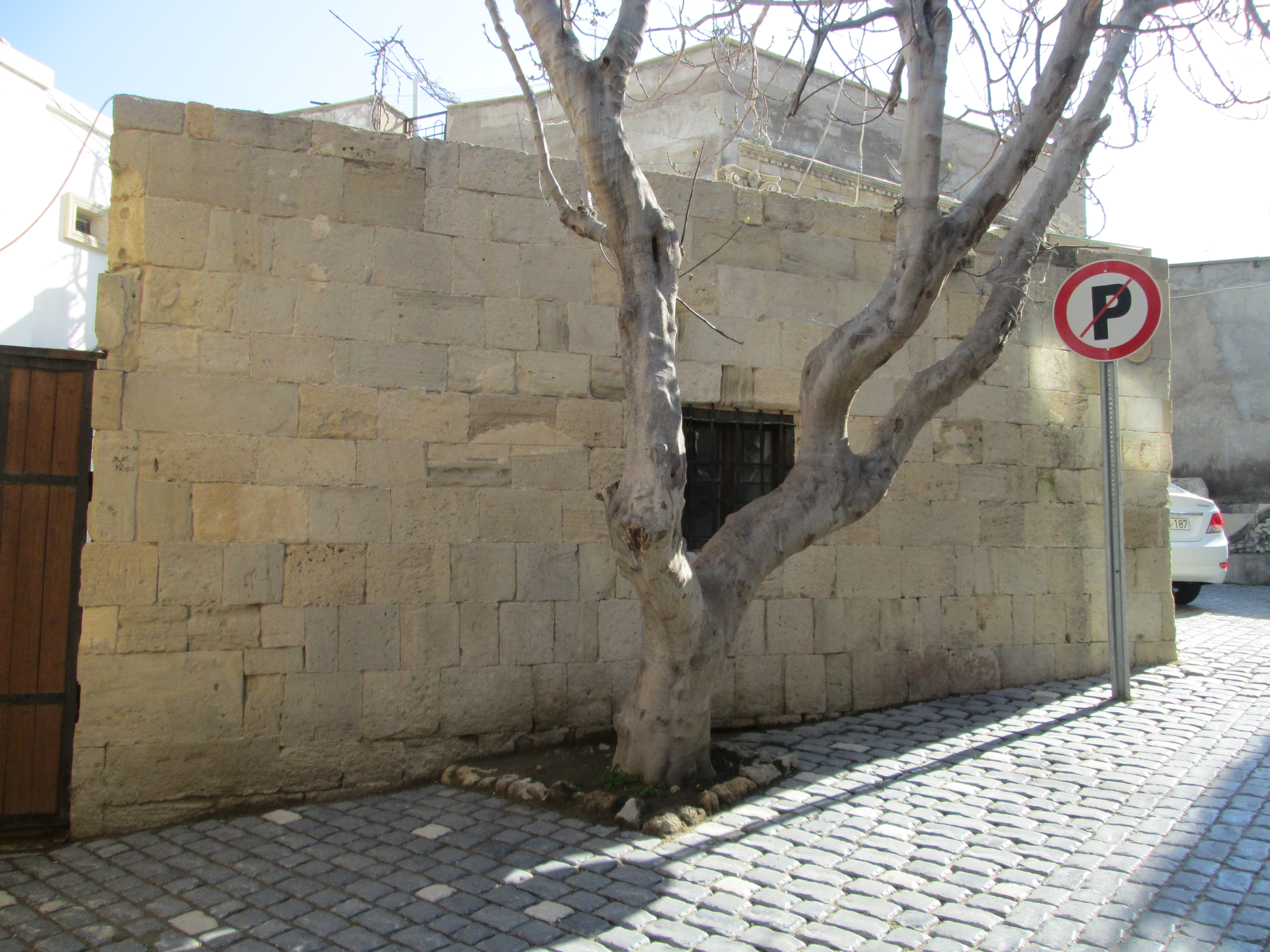

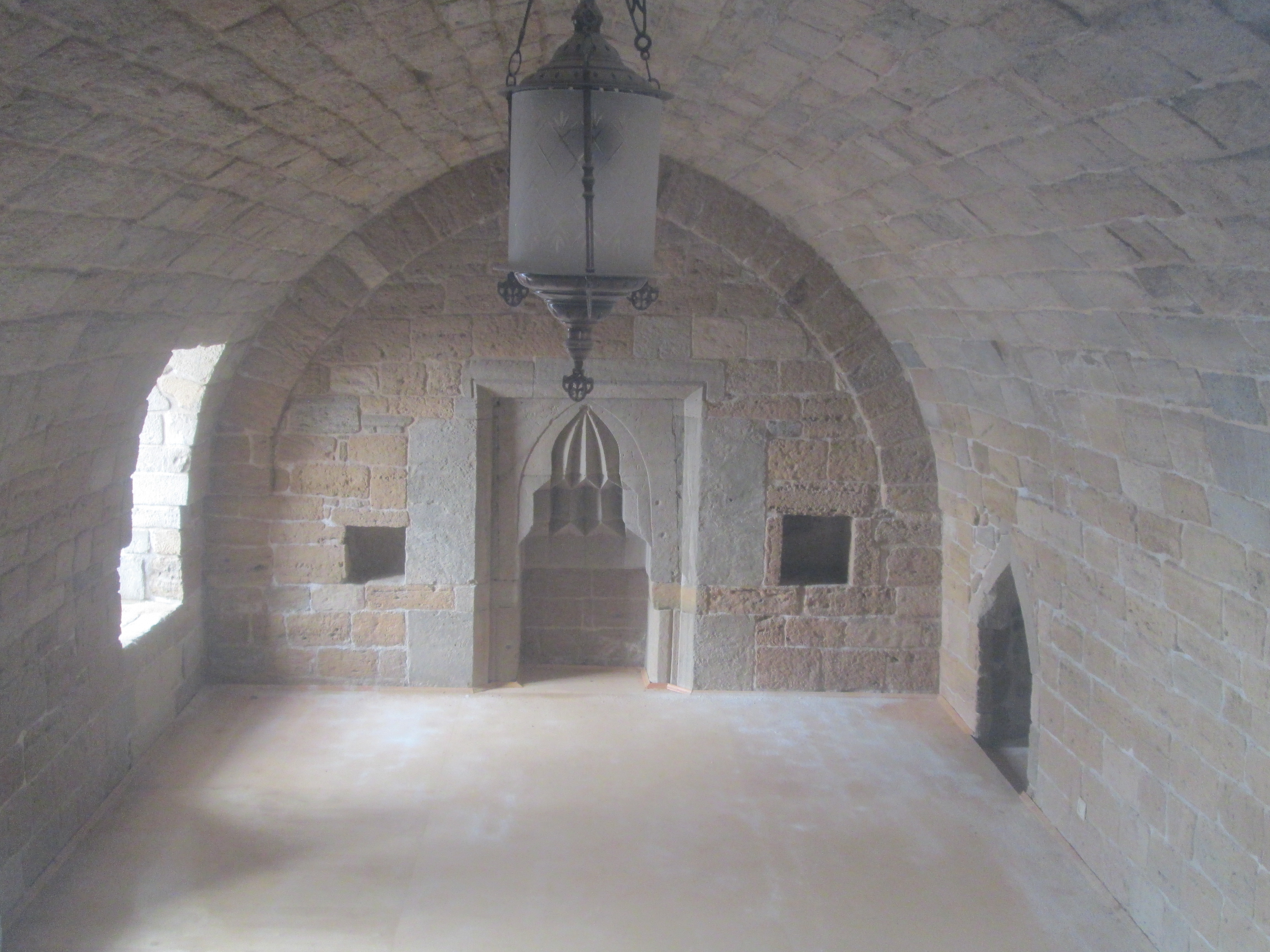

== See also ==
- Islam in Azerbaijan
- List of mosques in Azerbaijan
