= Mangalkot (ancient sculpture) =

Religion
- Affiliation: Hinduism
- District: Bogra

Location
- Location: Shibganj
- State: Rajshahi
- Country: Bangladesh

Mangalkot (Bengali: মঙ্গলকোট) sculptures are ancient terracotta figurines discovered by Alexander Cunningham in 1879 in the village of Chingaspur, located in the current Shibganj Upazila, Bogra district, Rajshahi, Bangladesh. The sculptures are characteristic of the Gupta period, featuring bow-shaped eye brows, eyes looking downward, pointed nose, smiling lips and sharp chin.

== Description ==
The Department of Archeology of Bangladesh conducted an excavation at the site in 1981–1983, and unearthed the remains of a temple with a dimension of 5.02 m x 4.92 m. Over a thousand artifacts were found in the excavation, most of which were earthen sculptures. The average height of the sculptures is 0.061 m, and most of them are busts of female figures, prominently of the Hindu Goddesses Manasa and Parvati. However, other male and female and animal figures are also found in the form of sculptures or terracotta plaques.

== See also ==
- Culture of Bangladesh
- History of Bangladesh
