= Jamalpur Shahi Mosque =

Mosque in Sadullapur, Gaibandha, Bangladesh

- জামালপুর শাহী মসজিদ
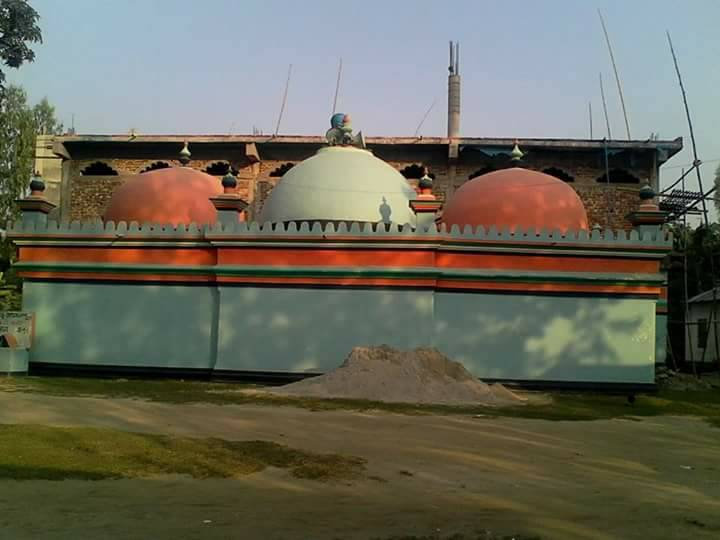

Religion
- Affiliation: Islam

Location
- Municipality: Sadullapur Upazila
- State: Gaibandha
- Country: Bangladesh

Architecture
- Type: mosque

Jamalpur Shahi Mosque (Bengali: জামালপুর শাহী মসজিদ) is a mosque located in Sadullapur Upazila of Gaibandha District, Bangladesh.

== Location ==
The mosque is located in Bara Jamalpur village under Sadullapur Upazila of Gaibandha District. It is situated about 6 kilometres west of the upazila headquarters.

== History ==
According to local tradition, this historic mosque was built in 930 by Hazrat Shah Jamal (R), who came from Persia to preach Islam. The area of Jamalpur was also named after him.

After the fall of the Muslim rule, during the British colonial period the mosque was buried under soil due to natural disasters. As there was no settlement around the mosque area, it became covered with dense forest and vegetation. In the early 1960s, Hakqani Kutubuddin, a devout person who served as the Sub-divisional Officer (SDO) of Gaibandha, heard about the history of the Shahi Mosque from local residents. After hearing their accounts, he began searching for the mosque with the help of the local people. However, a huge banyan tree had grown on the site and the mosque remained hidden behind it. One day, during a severe storm, the banyan tree collapsed and the local people rediscovered the mosque. Since then, people have referred to it as a Gayebi Mosque (mysteriously appeared mosque). In front of the Jamalpur Gayebi Mosque, a large pond also became visible.

According to local accounts, about seven hundred years ago a tyrannical Hindu ruler named Khirodhar (Ganjio) lived in this area. He was the ruler of three estates and had many soldiers who oppressed the local people. It is said that during that time the saint Hazrat Shah Jamal Chowdhury (R), regarded as a spiritually accomplished person from Sylhet, arrived in this region with his family. From that time, the mosque became known as Shah Jamal Shahi Mosque and the union was named Jamalpur.

== Description ==
Due to population growth, local residents expanded the floor area of the mosque by constructing a veranda in front of the original structure while keeping the main structure intact. There is also a shrine beside the mosque, which according to local belief belongs to Hazrat Shah Jamal.

Although part of the mosque’s original structure has gone underground, it still stands as a symbol of historical heritage. A large pond beside the mosque further enhances its beauty.
