= Dhanbari Zamindar Bari =

Coordinates: 24°40′31″N 89°57′18″E

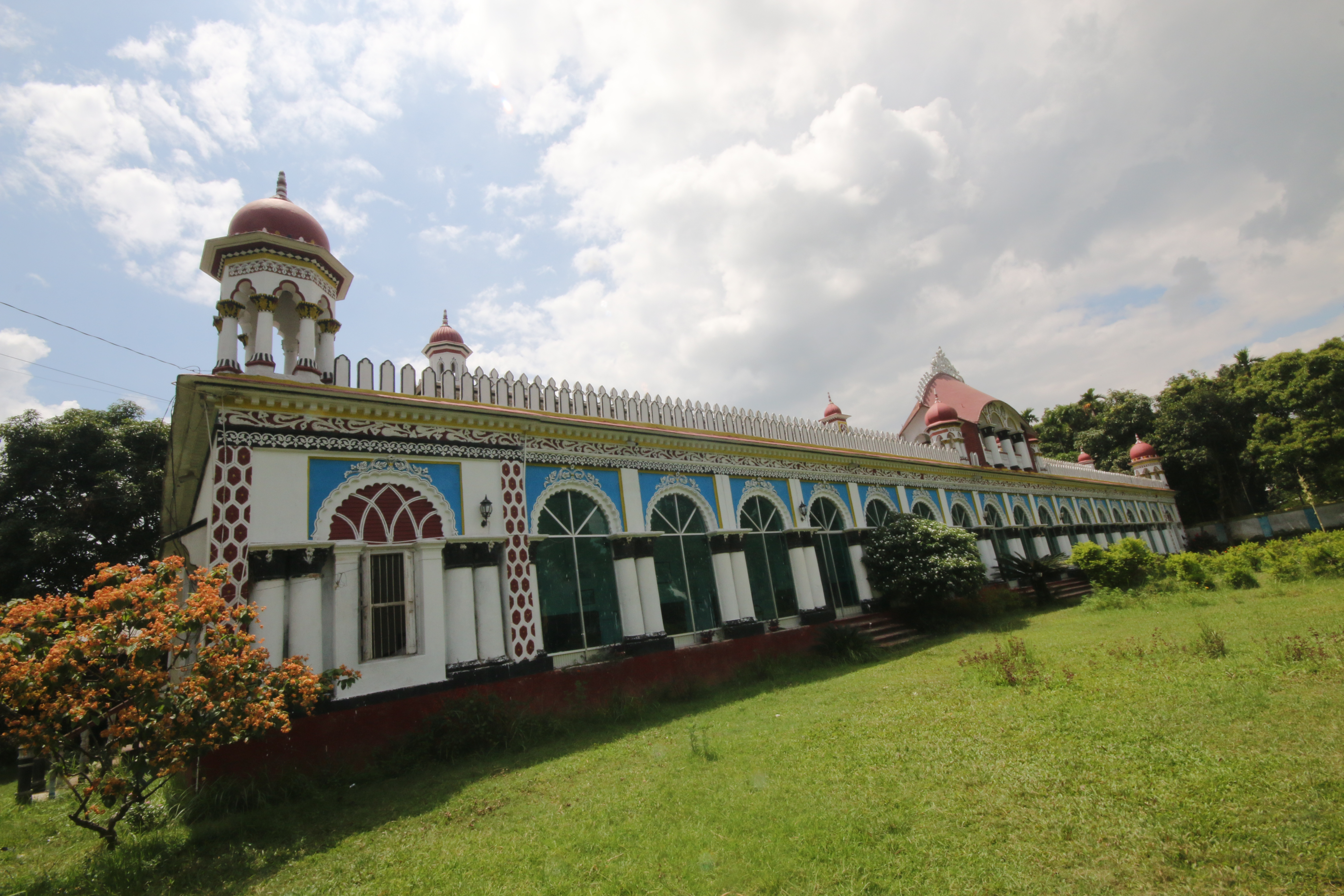
- Alternative names: Nawab Palace; Dhanbari Nawab Palace; Dhanbari Nawab Manzil

General information
- Type: Residential palace
- Location: Dhanbari Upazila, Tangail District, Bangladesh
- Opened: Circa mid-1800s

Technical details
- Material: Brick, lime mortar, and iron rods

Dhanbari Jomidarbari (Bengali: ধনবাড়ী জমিদারবাড়ি, Dhanbāṛī Jomidārbāṛi) (locally known as Nawab Palace or Nawab Manzil) is a historic zamindar residence located in Dhanbari Upazila of Tangail District, Bangladesh.

== History ==
The estate was established around the mid-1800s by Nawab Syed Nawab Ali Chowdhury, who was a zamindar honored with the titles Bahadur, Nawab, and C.I.E. by the British. He holds the distinction of being the first Muslim minister in the British Indian government. He was also a key figure in the founding of the University of Dhaka and is known as the first proposer of Bengali as the state language of Pakistan.

Some sources suggest that the estate originated even earlier, during the Mughal era, when generals Ispinger Khan and Monowar Khan Singh were defeated by a local military leader. Nonetheless, Nawab Syed Nawab Ali Chowdhury is widely recognized as the principal founder of the estate. His father first settled in Dhanbari, and the family gained reputation for successfully managing the zamindari.

Notable descendants of this family include Mohammad Ali of Bogra, the third Prime Minister of Pakistan, and Syed Hasan Ali Chowdhury, who served as the Minister of Industry in East Pakistan and was later elected to Parliament in independent Bangladesh from the Bangladesh Nationalist Party.

== Architecture ==
The estate features an elaborate and spacious complex consisting of small and large buildings with intricate architectural details. It is surrounded by beautifully maintained gardens. On the eastern side, there is a large reservoir (dighi) covering about 30 bighas.

Other features include flower gardens, a private zoo, guest quarters, staff residences (gomostas, naibs, guards), an administrative house (kachari ghar), and a courtyard for servants. A Mughal-era mosque, believed to be around 700 years old, is located on the premises and is now known as the Dhanbari Mosque. Adjacent to the mosque is the mausoleum of Nawab Ali Chowdhury. Since his death, four qaris (Qur'an reciters) have been continuously reciting the Qur'an at the site.
