= Kirtipasha Zamindar Bari =

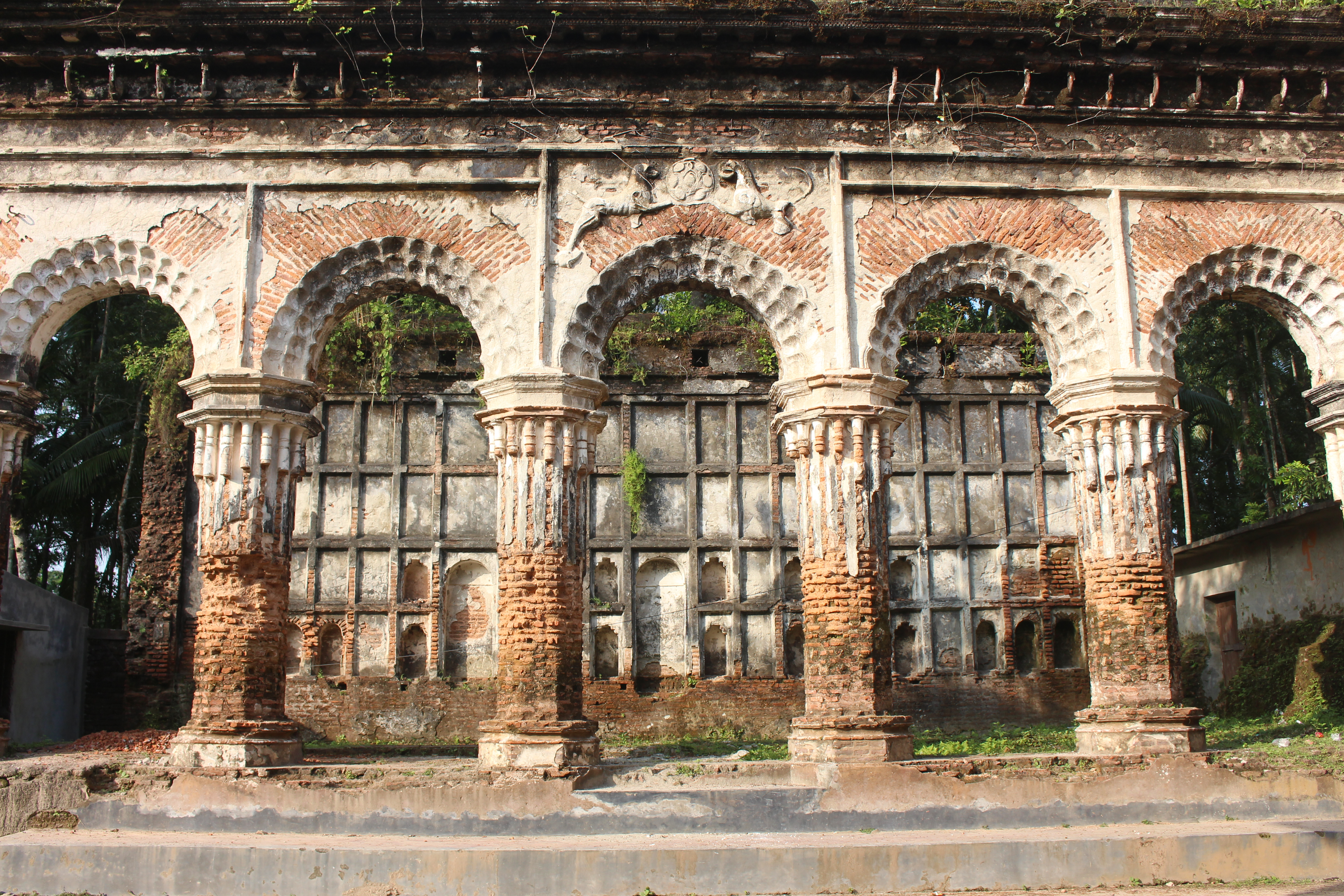

General information
- Type: Residential mansion
- Location: Jhalokathi Sadar Upazila, Jhalokathi District
- Opened: 1900
- Owner: Raja Ram Sengupta

Technical details
- Material: Brick, lime mortar, and iron rods

Kirtipasha Zamindar Bari is a historic zamindar estate located in Jhalokathi District, Bangladesh.

== Location ==
The mansion is situated in Kirtipasha village of Jhalokathi District in the Barisal Division. It lies approximately 4 to 5 kilometers northwest of Jhalokathi Sadar.

== History ==
The estate was established over a century ago by descendants of the zamindar family of Bikrampur in the late 19th century. In the early 1800s, Raja Ram Sengupta, a member of the Bikrampur zamindar lineage, settled in Kirtipasha village. He built two houses—one for each of his sons. The elder son's residence, known as the 10-ana Kirtipasha Zamindar Bari, was larger, while the younger son's 6-ana estate was comparatively smaller and has since been destroyed. Portions of the elder son’s mansion still remain.

The zamindar’s son was poisoned and died; his wife also died shortly after, and both were buried together. The estate still includes a natmandir (temple theater), hall room, and large and small Hindu temples.

Two notable figures from this zamindar family are Rohini Roy Chowdhury and Tapan Roy Chowdhury.
