= Kherua Mosque =

Mughal mosque in Bogra, Bangladesh

- খেরুয়া মসজিদ
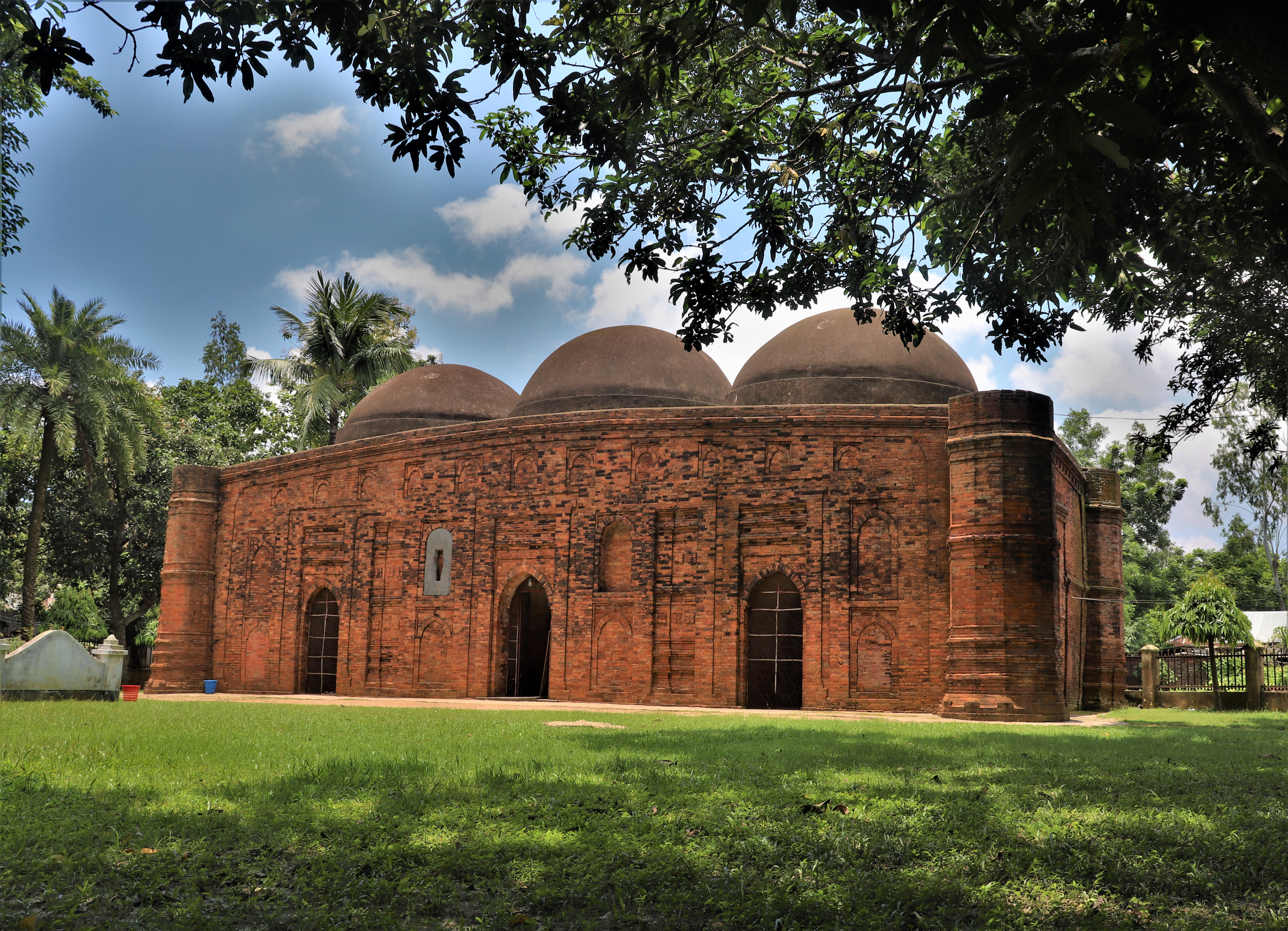

- Location within Bangladesh

Religion
- Affiliation: Islam
- Status: Active

Location
- Location: Sherpur, Bogra District, Bangladesh
- Coordinates: 24.6591°N 89.4171°E

Architecture
- Type: Mosque architecture
- Style: Bengal Sultanate Mughal
- Founder: Mirza Murad Khan
- Established: 1582; 444 years ago

Specifications
- Capacity: 100
- Length: 17.34 m (56.9 ft)
- Width: 7.54 m (24.7 ft)
- Interior area: 52.136 m^{2} (561.19 ft^{2})
- Dome: 3
- Dome dia. (outer): 3.71m
- Site area: 2387.38 m²
- Inscriptions: 2
- Materials: Brick, Stone

Website
- https://www.bogra.gov.bd/bn/site/page/খেরুয়া-মসজিদ

Kherua Mosque (Bengali: খেরুয়া মসজিদ) is a 16th-century mosque in Sherpur, Bogra, built in the early Mughal era. According to the inscription found in the mosque, it was built by Nawab Mirza Murad Khan, son of Jauhar Ali Khan Qaqshal, in 1582 AD (989 AH).

== History ==
An inscription on the front wall of the mosque reveals that it was constructed in 1582 by Mirza Murad Khan Qakshal, son of Jauhar Ali Khan Qakshal. The title "Qakshal" was given by the Turks. The Ghoraghat region was under the control of jagirdars. During that period, Sherpur was an administrative center under Ghoraghat. Historians speculate that Mirza Murad Khan Qakshal was likely a jagirdar or faujdar of Sherpur.

The origin of the name "Kherua" for the mosque is unclear. Historical account explains the name "Kherua," and no such word exists in Arabic or Persian. However, in Persian, the term Khair Gah means "within a place." During the time when Raja Man Singh was the governor of Bengal, he built a fort in Sherpur, which no longer exists. It is speculated that if the mosque was constructed within the premises of the Sherpur fort, the name "Kherua" might have derived from Khair Gah. This ancient mosque continues to be used for regular prayers. The abandoned mosque was repaired in 1956. Additionally, the Department of Archaeology has constructed a boundary wall around the mosque, ensuring a well-maintained environment.

== Architecture ==
The architectural complex measures externally 17.50 by 7.54 m (57.4 by 24.7 ft) with 2.01 m (6.6 ft) thick surrounding wall and features three hemispherical domes, each with a diameter of 3.71 meters, adorning the roof. The mosque plan, three-bayed perhaps five-bayed, popular in the Dehli Sultanate becomes typical of mosque architecture in Bengal during Mughal rule and later. The cornice exhibits a distinctive bow-like curvature, complemented by a series of arched panels arranged beneath it. The facade is embellished with carved floral and foliate motifs etched into the bricks. The structure has minarets, domes, and elaborate brickwork. In front of the mosque lies a rectangular courtyard covered in verdant grass, bordered by rows of palm, coconut, mango, and kadam trees, alongside seasonal flowering plants on one side. The entire precinct, spanning approximately 59 decimals, is enclosed by a brick wall topped with iron railings. Access to the courtyard is generally restricted only allowing worshippers during prayer times.

The mosque has two inscriptions on the east facade, both in Persian, which are written on the back of sculptured stelae. It has a capacity of holding one hundred worshipers.

== Gallery ==
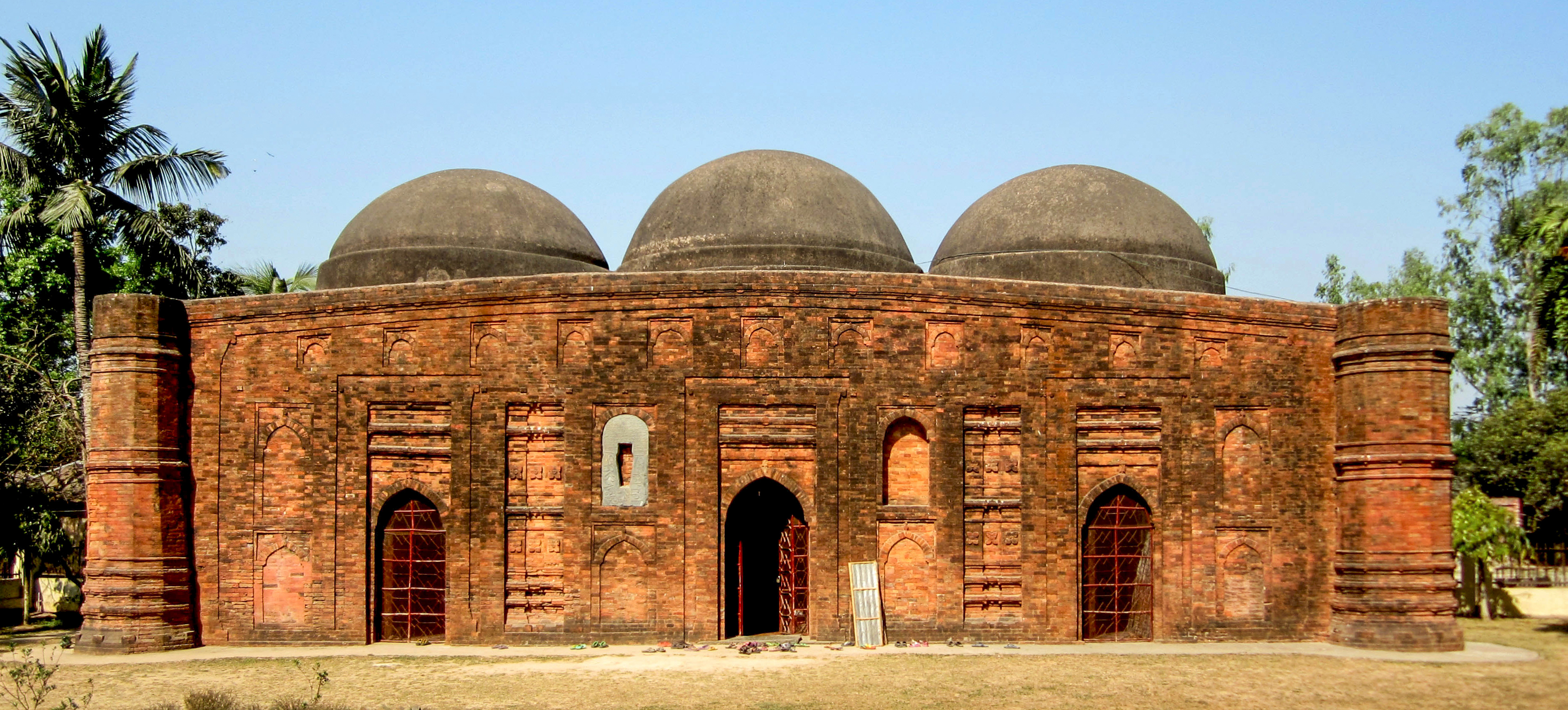
Façade of the mosque

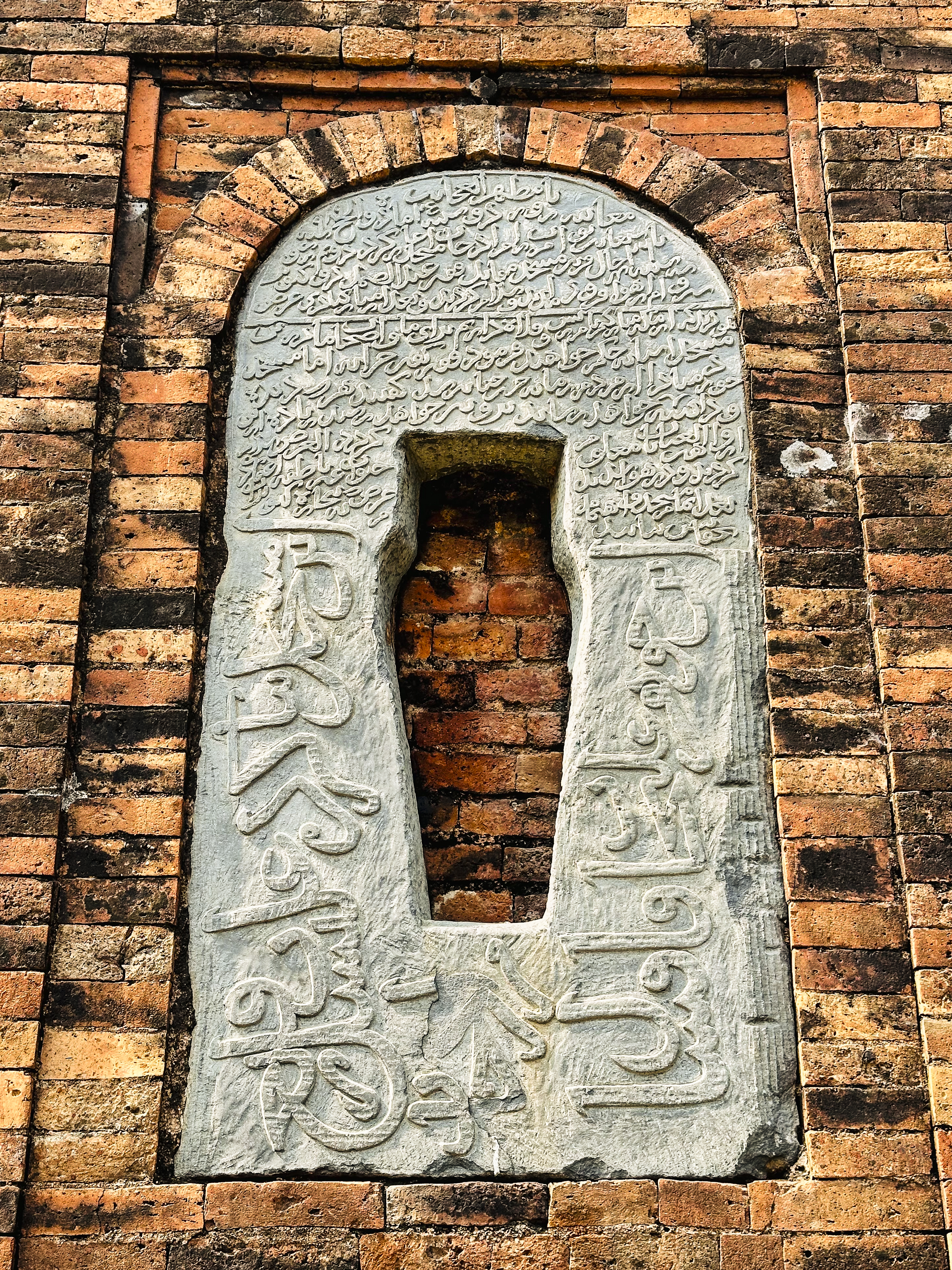
Inscription on the wall

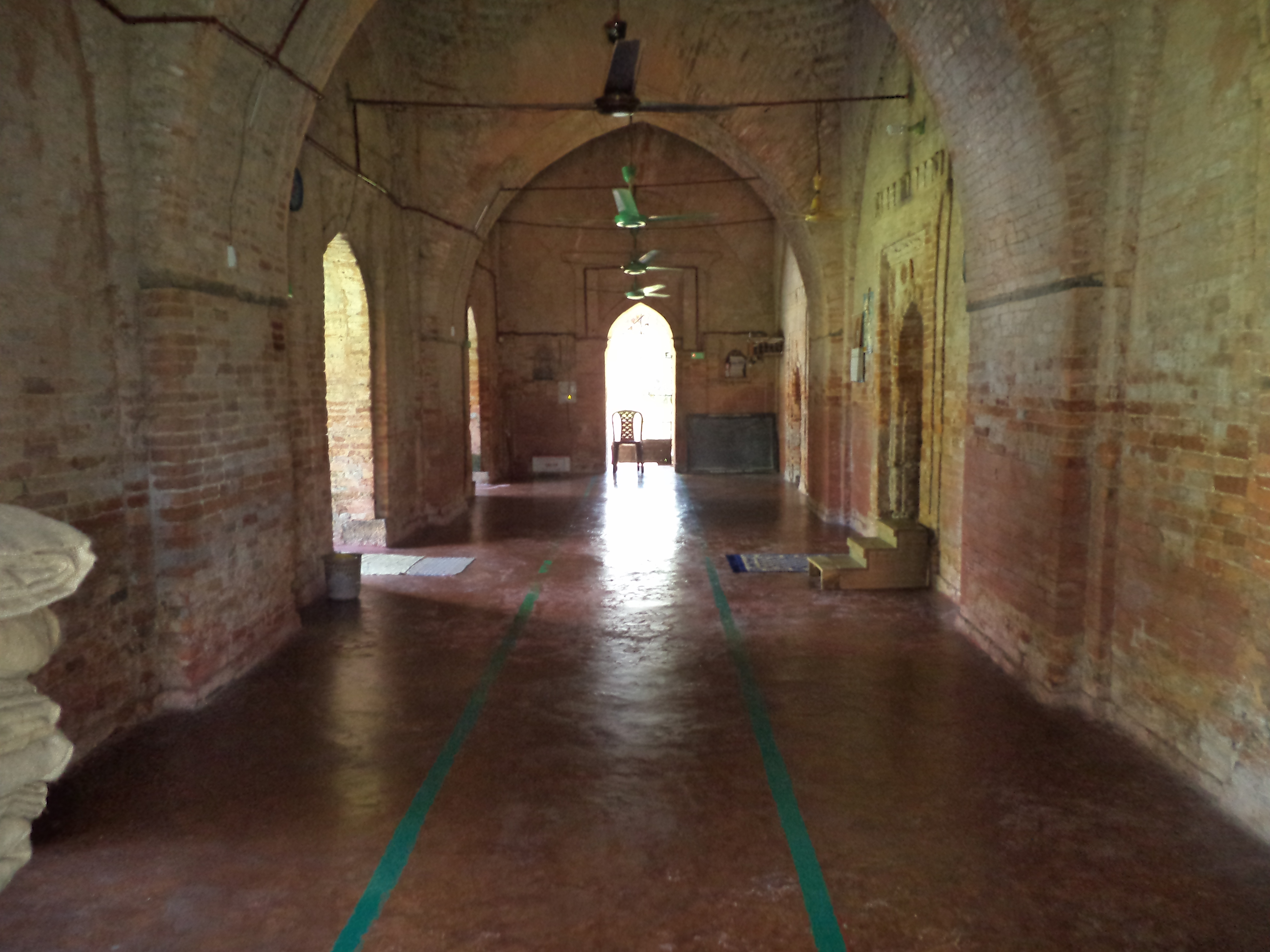
Interior view

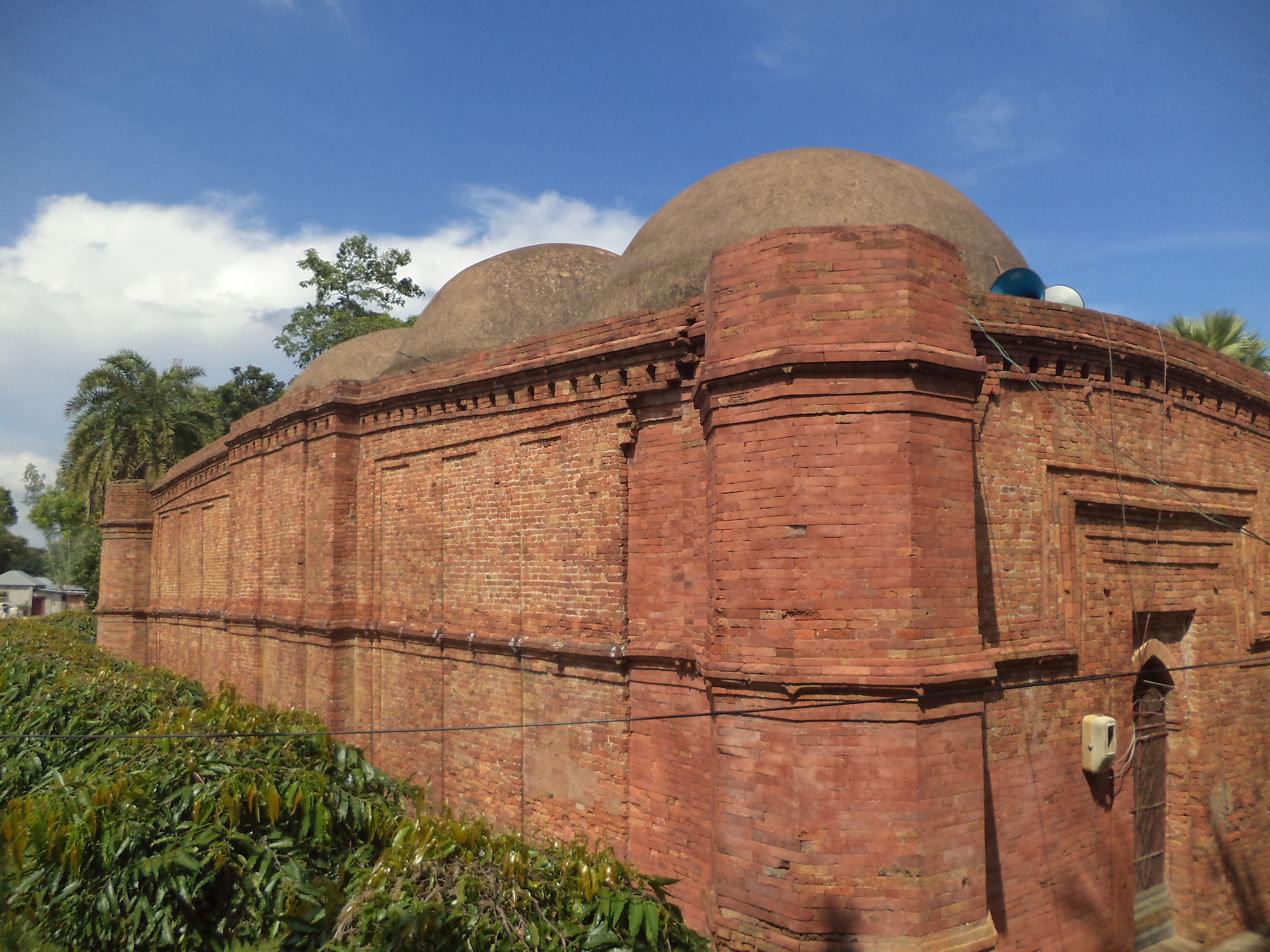
Side view

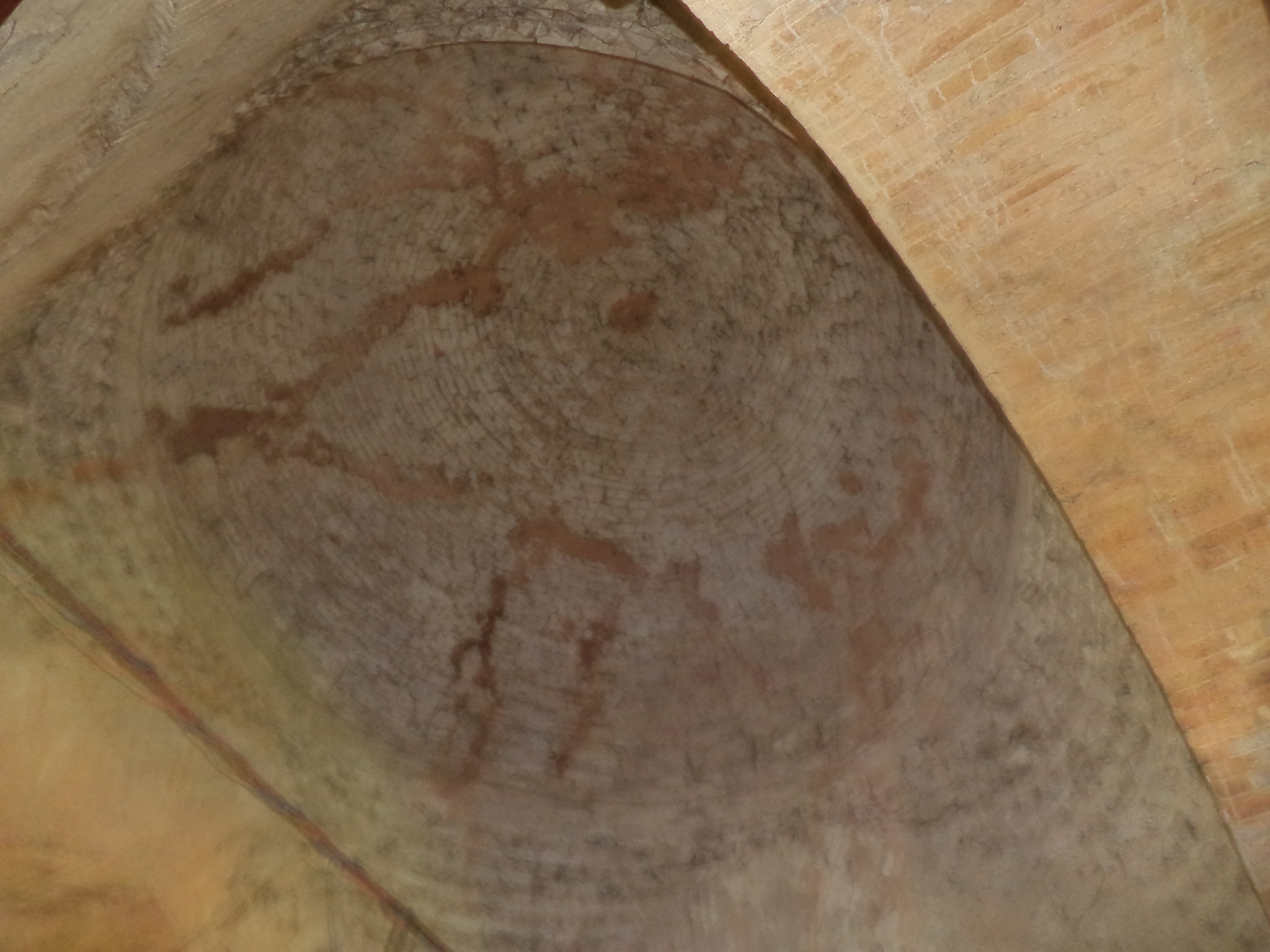
Interior view of dome (Gombuj)

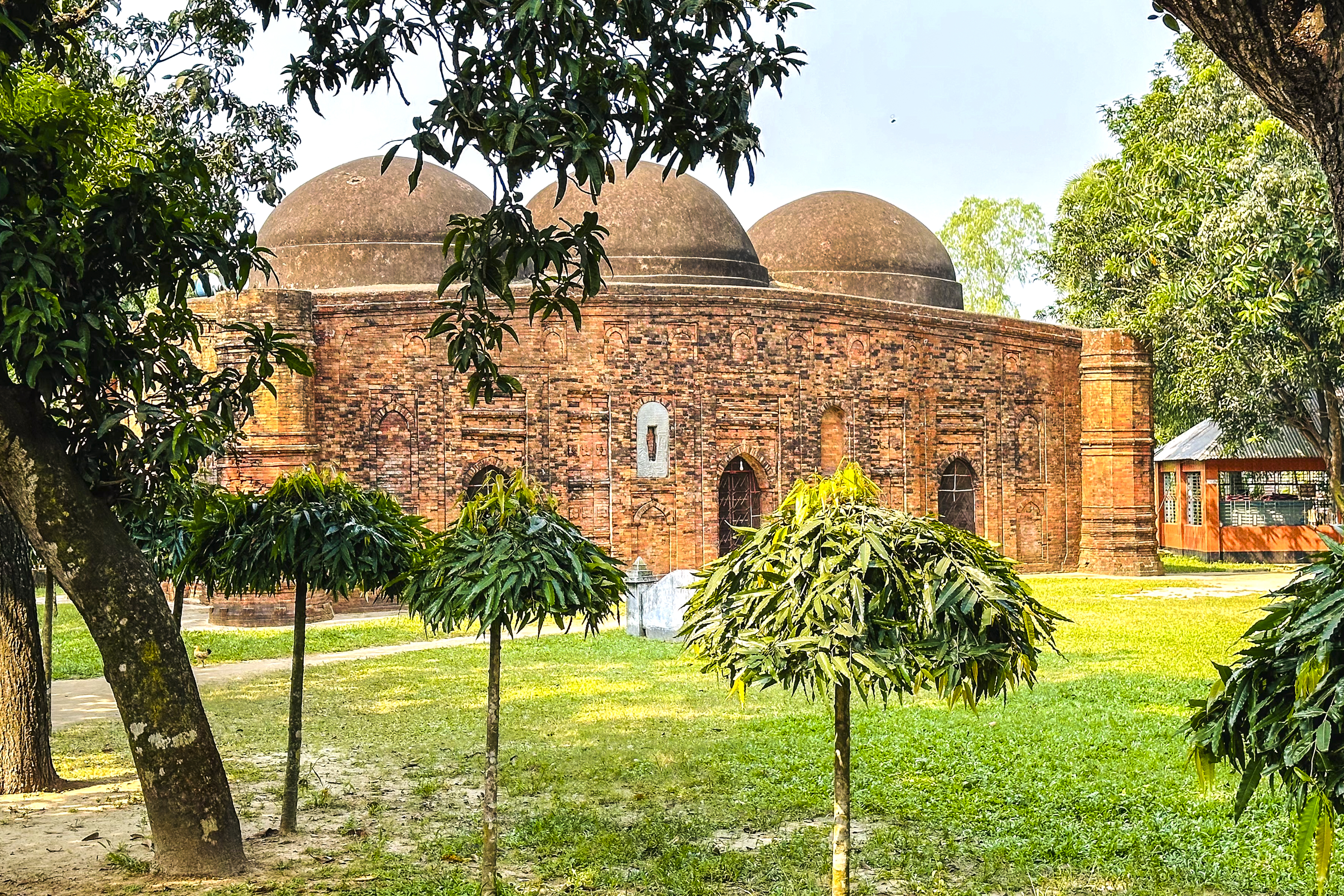
Mosque courtyard with palm, coconut, mango, and Kadam trees

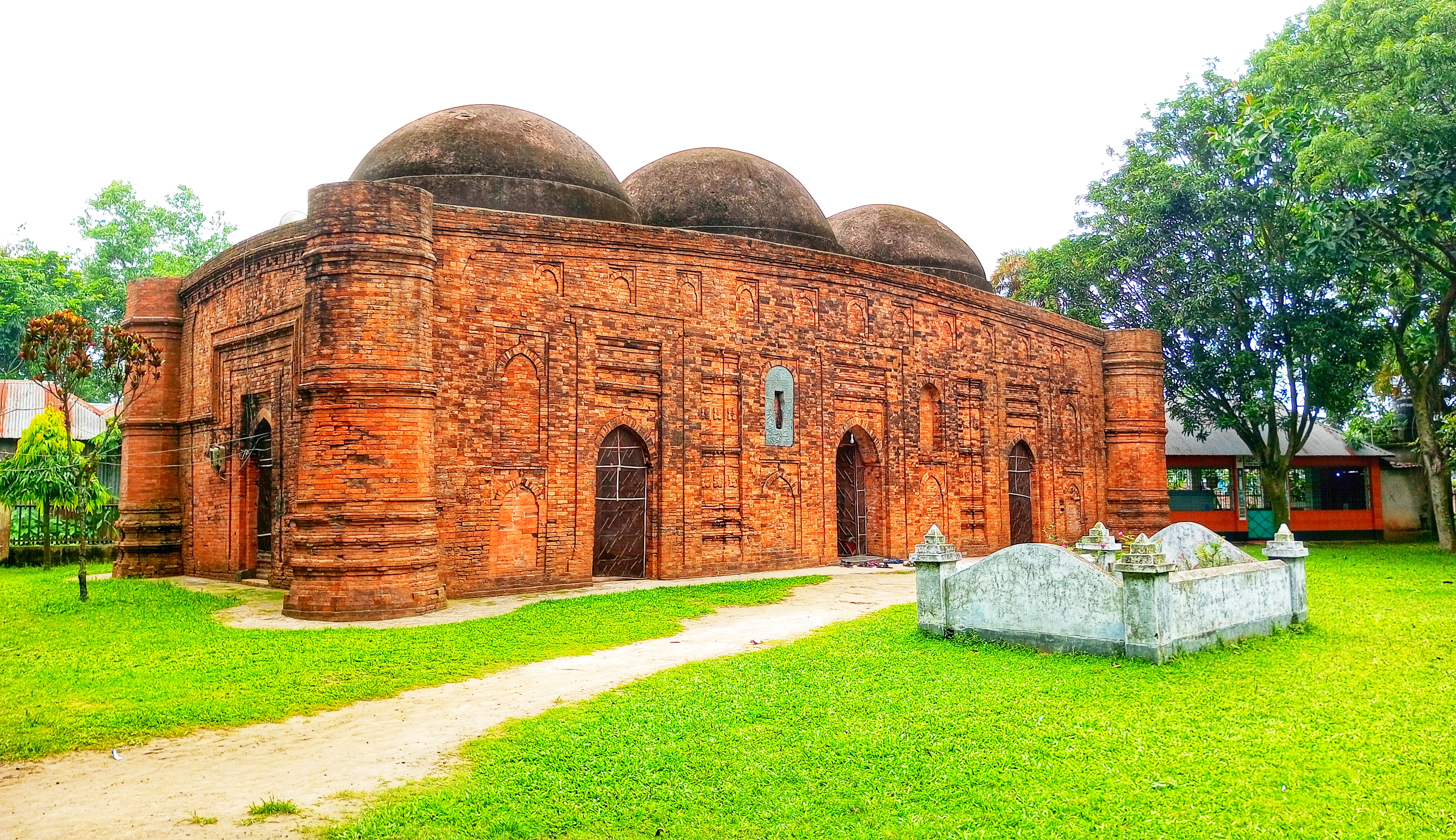
Adjoining tomb beside the Mosque

== See also ==
- List of mosques in Bangladesh

== Bibliography ==
- Michell, George (1984). The Islamic Heritage of Bengal. UNESCO. ISBN 978-92-3-102174-9.
- Ahmed, Abu Sayeed M. (2006). Mosque Architecture in Bangladesh. UNESCO Dhaka. ISBN 978-984-32-3469-8.
