= List of Hindu temples in Bangladesh =

This is a list of some of the most notable Hindu temples in Bangladesh by district. Bangladesh is home to over 15 million Hindus and has tens of thousands of sprawling temples in its 64 districts.

== Bagerhat District ==
Name	Location	Image	Year	Additional Notes
Bagerhat Shiva Mandir	Karnapur, Bagerhat		1936 AD	A Vedic era Hindu temple in Karnapur village, Sreepur.
Dashani Public Worship Temple	Bagerhat City		2014 AD	A new temple is under construction across from the current temple.
Sri Sri Sitala Mandir	Bagerhat City		1308 AD	The site has been a temple since 1308 AD and has gone through many constructions through the years.

== Bandarban District ==
Name	Location	Image	Year	Additional Notes
Satsang Vihar Temple	Meghla, Bandarban		2008 AD	The temple is a state-of-the-art temple for the local Hindu community, thousands converge at the temple during the holiest festivals.
Sri Sri Radha Giridhari Temple	Bandarban		2000 AD	The temple and a large plot of land has been owned by the ISKCON for over 2 decades and a large temple complex is currently under construction.
Mayer Mondir	Bandarban City		2005-2006	A temple at the heart of Bandarban City.

== Barguna District ==
(There are a lots of temples in Bagura but very few temples are listed here.)

- Sarvajanik Akhara Mandir, Barguna

== Barishal District ==
(There are lots of temples in Barishal but very few temples are listed here.)

- Sugandha Shaktipeeth, Shikarpur, Barishal
- Mahilara Sarkar Math
- Shankar Math

== Bhola District ==
(There are a lots of temples in Bhola but very few temples are listed here.)

- Shri Madon Mohon Thakur Jiur Mondir

== Brahmanbaria District ==
(There are a lots of temples in Brahmanbaria but very few temples are listed here.)

- Kal Bhairab Temple, Brahmanbaria
- Pagal Shankar Jiu Temple, Fandauk

== Bogura District ==
(There are a lots of temples in Bogra but very few temples are listed here.)

- Bhabanipur Shaktipeeth, Bhabanipur, Sherpur Upazila, Bogura

== Chandpur District ==
(There are a lots of temples in Chandpur but very few temples are listed here.)

- Shri Mehar Kalibari Temple

== Chittagong District ==
(There are a lots of temples in Chittagong but very few temples are listed here.)

- Chatteshwari Temple
- Ramakrishna Mission
- ISKCON Shree Radha Madhava Temple
- Kaibalyadham Ashram
- Anukulchandra Satsang Ashram
- Tulsi Dham Ashram
- Panchanan Dham Ashram
- Golpahar Mohashoshan Kali Temple
- Sadarghat Kali Temple (Kali Bari)
- Chittagong University Central Temple
- Chandranath Temple, Sitakunda Upazila
- Taracharan Sadhu Ashram, Dhalghat, Patiya Upazila
- Bura Kali Temple, Dhalghat, Patiya Upazila
- Kachuai Moddham Para Shree Shree Jalakumari & Durga Matri Mondir, Moddham para, Kachuai, Patiya, Chattagram.
- Neem Kali Temple, Kalipur, Banshkhali Upazila
- Shuklambar Dighi Temple, Chandanaish Upazila
- Rhadhamadob Temple, Socchidanondo Dham, Chandanaish Upazila.
- Goshaildanga Shoshan Kali Temple
- Nigamananda Paramahansa Ashram
- Hazari Lane Shiva Temple
- Sree Radhakrishna Temple, Raipur, Mirsharai Upazila
- Middle Tal Baria Worship Temple, Mirsarai Upazila

== Cumilla District ==
(There are a lots of temples in Comilla but very few temples are listed here.)

- Lalmai Chandi Temple
- Ayachak Ashram, Rahimpur Muradnagar, Cumilla.
- Cumilla Jagannath Temple, Cumilla
- Sri Sri Shiva and Chandi mata temple, Lalmai, Comilla.
- Sri Jagannath Bari temple, Laksam, Cumilla.
- Wahedpur Giri Dham
- Ratanpur Majumder Bari Temple
- Sri Sri Radha krishna Shevashrom Temple, Hasnabad, Monohorgonj, Cumilla

== Cox's Bazar District ==
(There are a lots of temples in Cox's Bazar but very few temples are listed here.)

- Adinath Temple, Moheshkhali

== Dhaka District ==
(There are a lots of temples in Dhaka but very few temples are listed here.)

- Dhakeshwari National Temple, Dhaka
- Joy Kali Temple, Dhaka
- Ramna Kali Temple, beside Suhrawardy Udyan, Dhaka
- Sri Sri Raksha Kali Mata Temple, Shakhari Bazar Dhaka
- Shiddeswari Kali Temple, Shiddeswari, Dhaka
- Ganesh Temple, Lakshmi Bazar, Dhaka
- Ganesh temple, Lakshmi Bazar, Dhaka
- Tapoban Temple Dhaka
- Ramakrishna Mission Temple, Dhaka
- ISKCON Swamibag Temple, Dhaka
- Mirpur-2 Central Temple, Dhaka
- Mirpur-13 Central Temple, Dhaka
- Sri Sri Radha Krishna and Durga Temple, Institute of Public Health (IPH) Mohakhali. Dhaka

=== Dhamrai Upazila ===
- Dhamrai Jagannath Roth, Dhamrai
- Jashomadhav temple, Dhamrai.
- Shiva temple, Dhamrai.
- Sri Sri Kali temple, Dakshinpara, Dhamrai.
- Dhar Krishna Mandir, Dhamrai

== Dinajpur District ==
(There are a lots of temples in Dinajpur but very few temples are listed here.)

- Gopalganj Twin Temple
- Kantaji Temple
- Kaliya jue Temple, Dinajpur

== Faridpur District ==
(There are a lots of temples in Faridpur but very few temples are listed here.)

- Sreedham Sreeangon, Faridpur Sadar

== Habiganj District ==
(There are a lots of temples in Habiganj but very few temples are listed here.)

- Kal Vairob Mandir, Balla, Habigonj

== Jashore District ==
(There are a lots of temples in Jashore but very few temples are listed here.)

- Jagannath Temple, Vatpara, Abhyanagar, Jashore.
- 11-Shiva temple, Vatpara, Abhyanagar, Jashore.
- Jagannath Temple, Keshabpur, Jashore.
- Kalodanga Kali Temple, Bagharpara, Jashore.
- Jora Shiva Temple, Murali mor, Jashore.
- Chanchra Shiva Temple, Jashore.
- Sri Rup Sanatan Smriti Tirtha, Ramsara, Abhaynagar, Jashore.
- Radha Krisna Temple, chourasta, Jashore

== Joypurhat District ==
- Sarbojonin Sri Sri Durga Temple Shampur, Joypurhat

== Khagrachhari District ==
- Jagannath Temple

== Khulna District ==
- Umananda Shiv Temple
- Kalibari Temple
- ISKCON Khulna
- Shree Shree Siddheshwari Kali Mata Temple

== Kishoreganj District ==
- Shivbari temple
- Chandravati Temple, Kishoreganj Sadar
- Kalibari Temple, Kishoreganj Sadar
- Gopinath Temple, Achmita, Katiyadi
- Loknath Temple, Kishoreganj
- Radha Govinda Temple, Etna
- Sri Sri Dakshina Kali Mandir, Palpara, Hilchia, Bajitpur

== Kurigram District ==
- Koteshwar Shiva Durga Temple, Bhimsharma
- Chaturvuj Shiva Temple, Chanai
- Pangeswari Temple, Rajarhat
- Sindurmati Tirthadham, Rajarhat
- Sri Sri Jagannath Namhatt Mandir, Old Post Office Para, Kurigram
- Dhamadhare Siddheshwari Temple
- Dolmancha Temple, Dhamamharta
- Chandi Temple, Kurigram
- Sri Sri Kali Siddheshwari Temple, Dhammahartha

== Lalmonirhat District ==
- Sindurmati Tithadham
- Banirdigi Iskcon Temple

== Madaripur District ==
- Jora Bangla Temple

== Magura District ==
- Kali temple, Magura
- Sri Sri Ma Durga temple, Mandal Bari, Baliaghata, Sreepur, Magura
- Sassan Kali temple, Chilgari, Sreepur, Magura

== Moulvibazar District ==
- Vishnupad Temple, Tarapasha, Moulvibazar.
- Patrikul Shiva Temple, Patrikul, Bhunabir, Sreemangal.
- Lord Krishna Temple, Patrikul, Bhunabir, Sreemangal.
- Patrikul Durga Temple, Patrikul, Bhunabir, Sreemangal.
- Sri Srimangaleshwari Kali Temple at Sreemangal
- Sri Maheswari Durga Temple, Saiarpur Moulvibazar
- Kadipur Shiv Bari Temple, Kulaura
- Shree Shree Shashan Kali Temple, Daspara, Bhairabgonj Bazar, at Sreemangal
- Shree Shree ShyamSundar Jiu Temple, Naraynpur, Bhairabgonj Bazar, Sreemangal
- Shree Shree DurgaBari Temple, Naraynpur, Bhairabgonj Bazar, Sreemangal
- Shree Shree Bhairav Temple Bhairabgonj Bazar, at Sreemangal
- Shree Shree Durga Temple BhairabgonjBazar, at Sreemangal

== Munshiganj District ==
- Sonarang Twin Temples
- Shekhar Nagar Sri Raksha Kali temple, Shirajdikhan, Munshiganj.

== Mymensingh District ==
- Boro Kali Bari Temple, Mymensingh
- Shiv Bari Temple, Mymensingh
- Dashabhuja Bari Temple, Mymensingh
- Bishwanath Temple, Muktagacha Upazila, Mymensingh
- Thanarghat Shiv Temple, Muktagacha Upazila, Mymensingh
- Jhora Kali Temple, Muktagacha Upazila, Mymensingh
- Sri Sri Raj Rajeshwari Durga Temple, Muktagacha Zamindar Bari, Mymensingh
- Sri Sri Bileshwari Kali Temple, Konabari, Trishal, Mymensingh

== Narayanganj District ==
- Baba Lokenath Brahmachari Ashram, Barodi, Narayanganj, an ashram of Lokenath Brahmachari

== Naogaon District ==
- Naogaon Sri Sri Kali Matar Prangan
- Naogaon Shiv Kali Mandir
- Naogaon Andamayi Maa Kali Mandir

== Noakhali District ==
(There are a lots of temples in Noakhali but very few temples are listed here.)

- Sonaimuri Kali Bari Mandir
- Sonaimuri Narayan Mandir
- Sonaimuri Gadhadhar Kund Snan Dighi
- Sonaimuri Gadhadhar Kund Durga Mandir
- Sonaimuri Gadhadhar Kund Narayan Mandir
- Sonaimuri Baba Lokhnath Mandir
- Sonaimuri Alokpara Kali Mandir
- Sonaimuri DurshimPara Mahaprabhu Mandir
- Sonaimuri Maha Shanshan Ghat
- Chowmuhani Radha Krishna Jiur Mandir
- Chowmuhani Ram Thakur Samadhi
- Chowmuhani Lokhnath Mandir
- Chowmuhani ISKCON Mandir
- Chowmuhani Porabari Kali Mandir
- Chowmuhani Durga Mandir
- Chowmuhani Chowrasta Kali Mandir
- Chowmuhani Maha Shanshan Ghat
- Maijdee Ram Thakur Ashram
- Maijdee Maha Shanshan Ghat
- Kalyandi Durga Temple

== Pabna District ==
(There are a lots of temples in Pabna but very few temples listed here.)

- Jagannath Temple, Pabna, Pabna

== Pirojpur District ==
(There are a lots of temples in Pirojpur but very few temples listed here.)

- Utter Shaker pur Temple
- Sri guru Temple Kawkhali

== Rajshahi District ==
(There are many temples in Rajshahi but very few temples are listed here.)

- Temple of King Kangsa Narayan
- Puthia Temple Complex
- Bara Anhik Mandir
- Chauchala Chhota Govinda Mandir
- Chhota Shiva Mandir
- Chota Anhik Mandir
- Do-Chala Chhota Ahnik Mandir
- Dol-Mandir
- Pancha Ratna Govinda Temple
- Pancha Ratna Shiva Temple
- Tarapur Mandir
- Gopal Mandir
- Dharmashova Temple, Ghoramara, Rajshahi.
- Sree Sree Madhav Temple, Court, Rajshahi.
- Chondipur Kali Temple, Rajshahi.
- Kashiadanga Shiva Temple, Rajshahi.
- Borda Kali Temple, Kumar Para, Rajshahi
- Saheb Bazar Temple, Rajshahi.
- Jora Kali Temple, Rashahi
- Keshavpur Temple, Police Line, Rajshahi.
- Hanumanji Temple, Ganok Para, Rajshahi.
- Bulonpur Ghosh Para Temple, Rajshahi.
- Sree Gourango Temple, Khetor Dham, Rajshahi.
- Shosan Kali Temple, Rajshahi.
- Ghoshpara Temple, Kajla, Rajshahi.
- Shiva Temple, Sree Rampur, Rajshahi.
- Melon Temple, Medical College Ghoshpara, Rajshahi.
- Iskon Temple, Premtoli, Rajshahi.
- Iskon Temple, Ghoramara, Rajshahi.
- Sree Kali Temple, Rajar Hata, Rajshahi.
- Sree Shiva Temple, Hetem Khan, Rajshahi.
- Sree Krishna Temple, Premtoli, Rajshahi.
- Sree Krishna Temple, Rani Bazar, Rajshahi.
- Sree Kali Temple, Fudki Para, Saheb Bazar, Rajshahi.
- Sree Shiva Temple, Bose Para, Rajshahi.
- Sree Shiva Temple, Puthia, Rajshahi.
- Navaratna Temple, Puthia, Rajshahi.
- Sree Shiva Temple, Shekher Chalk, Rajshahi.
- Padma Temple, Ghosh Para, Kumar Para, Rajshahi.
- Baro Ahnik Temple, Rajshahi City, Rajshahi.
- Ponchoboti Crematorium Temple, Rajshahi City, Rajshahi.
- Talaimari Kali Temple, Rajshahi City, Rajshahi.
- Charghat Durga Temple, Charghat, Rajshahi.
- Rajshahi University Temple, Charghat, Rajshahi.

== Rangpur District ==
- Bolta Para Hari Temple

== Satkhira District ==
- Jeshoreshwari Kali Temple, Shyamnagar, Satkhira
- Mayer Bari, Annapurna Temple, Puraton Satkhira,
- Gokulananda Temple, Pathbari, Debhata, Satkhira.

== Shariatpur District ==
- Sri Satyanarayan Seva Mandir

== Sherpur District ==
- Ma Kali temple

== Sirajganj District ==
- Navratna Temple

Sree Sree Lakshmi Narayan and Gopal Dev Bigroho Mandir Tarash

== Sunamganj District ==
- Kejaura Shree Shree Kali Temple, Sunamganj

== Sylhet District ==
- Shri Shail
- Sri Maha Lakshmi griba pith
- Jaintapur Kali temple
- Shri Shri Madan Gopal Jiur Akhra

== Tangail District ==
1. Tangail Boro Kali Temple.
2. Paul Para Nath Temple, Tangail
3. Sri Radha Kalachand temple, Pakulla, Mirzapur.
4. Goddess Kali temple, Mirzapur.
5. Sri Sri Smashan Kali temple, Mohera, Mirzapur, Tangail.
6. RP Saha Nat Mandir, Mirzapur, Tangail.
7. Ranada Prasad Saha Durga temple, Mirzapur, Tangail.
8. Kali mata mandir, Saha para, Mirzapur, Tangail.

== Thakurgaon District ==
- Sri Sri Radha Gopinath Iskcon Temple, Thakurgaon
- Nanuhar Soth Songho Horibasor Mondir, Pirganj, Thakurgaon
- Lists of Hindu temp
