= Dhopapara High School =

- ধোপাপাড়া উচ্চ বিদ্যালয়

Location
- Dhopapara, Puthia Upazila, Rajshahi; Bangladesh

Information
- Type: Public
- Established: 1988
- School district: Rajshahi
- Enrollment: 800
- Campus: rural
- Website: https://dhschool1972.edu.bd/

Dhopapara High School (Bengali: ধোপাপাড়া উচ্চ বিদ্যালয়) is a secondary school in the center of Dhopapara, a village at Puthia in Rajshahi. It was established in 1988.
