= Parnasree Pally =

- Neighbourhood in Kolkata (Calcutta)
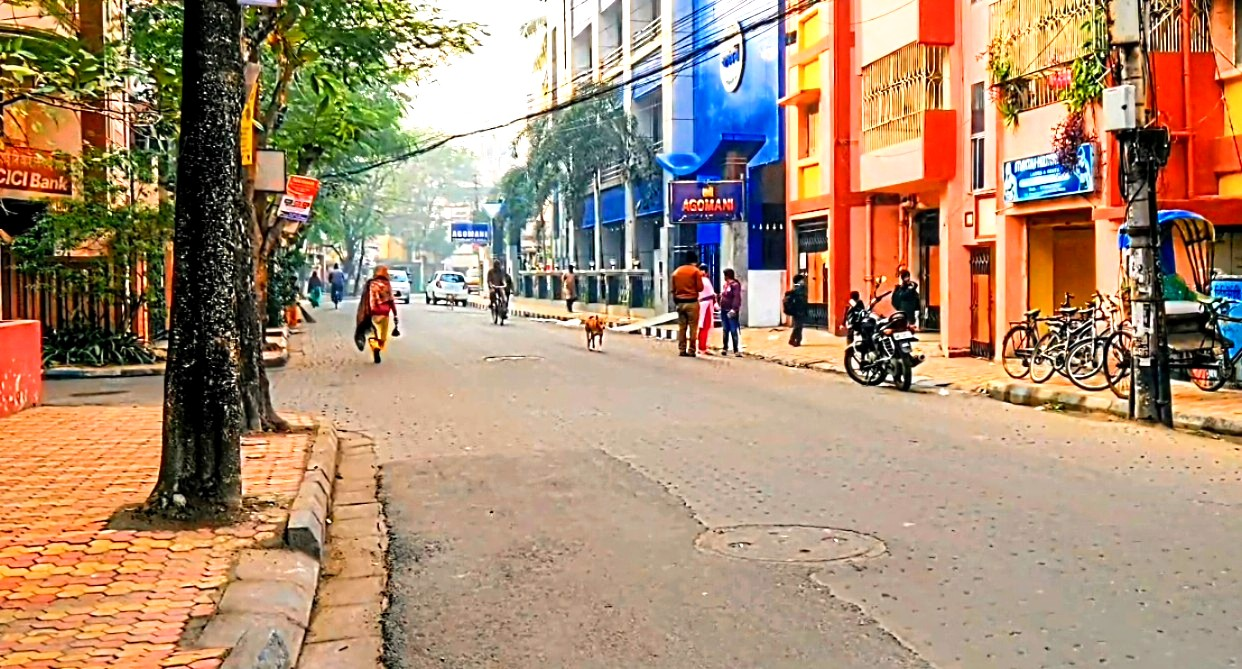
- Parnasree Pally, Upen Baneerjee Road

- Location in Kolkata
- Coordinates: 22.509°N 88.306°E
- Country: India
- State: West Bengal
- City: Kolkata
- District: Kolkata
- Kolkata Suburban Railway: Brace Bridge
- Municipal Corporation: Kolkata Municipal Corporation
- KMC ward: 131
- Elevation: 36 ft (11 m)
- Time zone: UTC+5:30 (IST)
- PIN: 700060
- Lok Sabha constituency: Kolkata Dakshin
- Vidhan Sabha constituency: Behala Paschim

Parnasree Pally is an upscale residential area located in Behala, a locality in southern Kolkata (formerly Calcutta), India. It was incorporated into the Kolkata Municipal Corporation in 1985. The name "Parnasree" translates to "beauty of the leaves" in English. Previously known as Halderbagan, it is believed that the Halders were associated with the Sabarna Roy Chowdhury family. The name "Parnasree" was coined by the late Asoke Ratan Mazumder when he became a member of the cooperative society established for the rehabilitation of refugees during the Partition of India in 1947.

== History ==
In 1941, as preparations for war against a potential Japanese invasion began in India, a piece of land locally known as Halder Bagan was acquired by the government for constructing an airstrip. An "Anti-Aircraft" gun was also installed on the site. After the war, the land came under the jurisdiction of the Central Government, with portions allocated to the Calcutta Port Trust and the local government. Following Independence, Dr. B.C. Roy, the first Chief Minister of West Bengal, directed the Land and Land Revenue department to utilize the land effectively.

Adjacent to present-day Taratola Road, a low-lying marshy area was filled by a company contracted for the later development of Salt Lake. As a preliminary endeavor, they filled this low-lying area. Regarding the Parnasree episode, the Bengal Government announced the establishment of a cooperative society for East Bengal refugees to develop a habitable planned township in accordance with municipal norms set by the South Suburban Municipality. The Land and Land Revenue department formed a steering committee chaired by Mr. Amal Home of Hindusthan Insurance Company (later LIC) with members including Mr. Kshitindra Mohan Sen, Ex-Director of Customs, Mr. Mahendra Kumar De, Dr. Rukmini Dutta Roy, Mr. M. L. Dhar, Lawyer, and Mr. Nikhil Adhikari of United Bank of India.

The initial office of this cooperative society was set up in Mr. M.L. Dhar's chamber at Dover Lane in September 1948. The scenario involved the promotion of the New Alipore township by Hindusthan, offering large plots with modern amenities such as sewerage, water connection, metal roads, and electrified streets. Many Hindusthan employees, unable to afford plots in New Alipore due to its high price, turned to the new project office for information. It was then that Mr. Asoke Ratan Mazumder suggested the name Parnasree Pally Samabay Samiti for the cooperative, which was accepted by a voice vote and promptly registered in October 1948.

The cooperative began selling shares, priced at Rs. 100 per person with an option to pay Rs. 50 initially and the remaining Rs. 50 within six months. Mr. Robin Routh conducted surveys and planned site layouts, while low-lying areas were filled by digging ponds. The developed lands were gradually transferred to Parnasree Pally Samabay Samiti and distributed to shareholders for municipal mutation at Rs. 500 per plot. Numerous deed conveyances with the Government of West Bengal were later executed at stipulated prices.

== Present day ==
The local dhobis of Parnasree are considered some of the oldest residents of the area and can still be found in the Dhopapara area, consisting of two to three houses. Parnasree also hosts several banks, including the State Bank of India, Punjab National Bank (formerly United Bank of India), Allahabad Bank, Axis Bank, Bank of Baroda, and HDFC Bank, along with a few ATMs of other banks. Additionally, the area is home to the Parnasree Palli Post Office, which is assigned the postal code 700060.

A 40-foot wide road encircles the core area of Parnasree, leading to the junction of Banamali Naskar Road and Upen Banerjee Road, where it merges back into Upen Banerjee Road at RIC More (Crossing). Parnasree features a bustling bus station where various bus routes, including 13, S4, S4D, AC4, AC4A, E4, VS-4, and Parnasree Howrah Mini bus, terminate. Moreover, Parnasree Pally is situated in close proximity to Behala Airport, which is slated for conversion into a regional air traffic hub for Bengal and other nearby areas.

== Geography ==
=== Police district ===
Parnashree Police Station operates within the South West division of Kolkata Police. Situated at the Ward Health Unit on Upen Banerjee Road, Block-14, Parnasree Pally, Kolkata-700060, it holds jurisdiction over an area bordered on the north by Taratala Police Station, on the east by Behala Police Station, on the south by Thakurpukur Police Station, and on the west by Mahestala Police Station.

Behala Women Police Station, situated at the same address as Behala Police Station, serves the entire jurisdiction of the South West division, including Sarsuna, Taratala, Behala, Parnasree, Thakurpukur, and Haridevpur police stations.

Jadavpur, Thakurpukur, Behala, Purba Jadavpur, Tiljala, Regent Park, Metiabruz, Nadial, and Kasba police stations were transferred from South 24 Parganas to Kolkata in 2011. With the exception of Metiabruz, all of these police stations were divided into two. The newly established police stations are Parnasree, Haridevpur, Garfa, Patuli, Survey Park, Pragati Maidan, Bansdroni, and Rajabagan.

== Transport ==
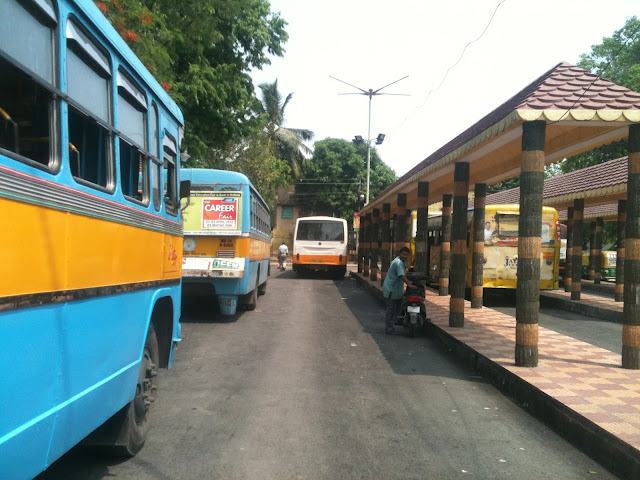
Parnasree Bus Terminus

Parnasree has a bus terminal named Parnasree Bus Terminus. A variety of AC & Non-AC Buses depart from this terminus.

=== Bus ===
WBTC

- S-4 (Parnasree - Karunamoyee)
- AC-4 (Parnasree - Howrah Stn)
- AC-49 (Parnasree - Ecospace)
- AC-4A (Parnasree - Ecospace)
- S-4D (Parnasree - Ecospace)
- E-4 (Parnasree - Howrah Stn)

== Education ==
The following institutions are located in Parnasree:

1. Parnasree Vidyamandir H. S. School
2. Sharada Vidyapith for girls
3. Behala College
4. Behala Government Polytechnic College
5. Holy Cross Mission School
6. Sishu Bharati Uccha Bidyamandir
7. Behala Boys High School
8. Alankrita Tutorials and Alankrita Careers
9. Kidzee
10. Eurokids
11. Pathfinder
12. Path creator
13. Sikkhan
