= Gowpara =

Coordinates: 24.3717°N 88.8878°E

Gaupara (Bengali: ગૌપરા) is a village situated in Puthia Upazila, Rajshahi District, Bangladesh. It has a population of around 1000. There is a primary school in the village named Gaopara Govt. There is a high school by the great highway between Dhaka and Rajshahi, the busiest highway in the country.
