= Kaal Bhairav Mandir =

Kaal Bhairav Mandir may refer to any temple dedicated to the Hindu deity Kaal Bhairav, including:

- Kaal Bhairav Mandir, Varanasi, India
- Kal Bhairav temple, Ujjain, India
- Kal Bhairab Temple, Brahmanbaria, Bangladesh

== See also ==
- List of Bhairava temples
- Kaal Bhairav Rahasya
