= Do-Chala Chhota Ahnik Mandir =

Temple in Bangladesh

Do-Chala Chhota Ahnik Mandir is a Hindu temple of the Puthia Temple Complex in Puthia Upazila, Rajshahi Division, Bangladesh. The temple faces east, near the north-west corner of the residence of Maharani Hemanta Kumari. Believed to date to the 1790s-1800s period, it has a rectangular ground plan, with triple archways in the east and south. The east and south facades are "highly decorated with terracotta plaques depicting Radha-Krishna-Balram legends, the episode of Ramayana and floral motifs like the Bara Govinda Mandir. The roof cover is of do-chala type (similar to the mud plastered houses in Bengal with layers of slanting rounded roofs) with curved cornice.
