= Bara Anhik Mandir =

Hindu temple in Bangladesh

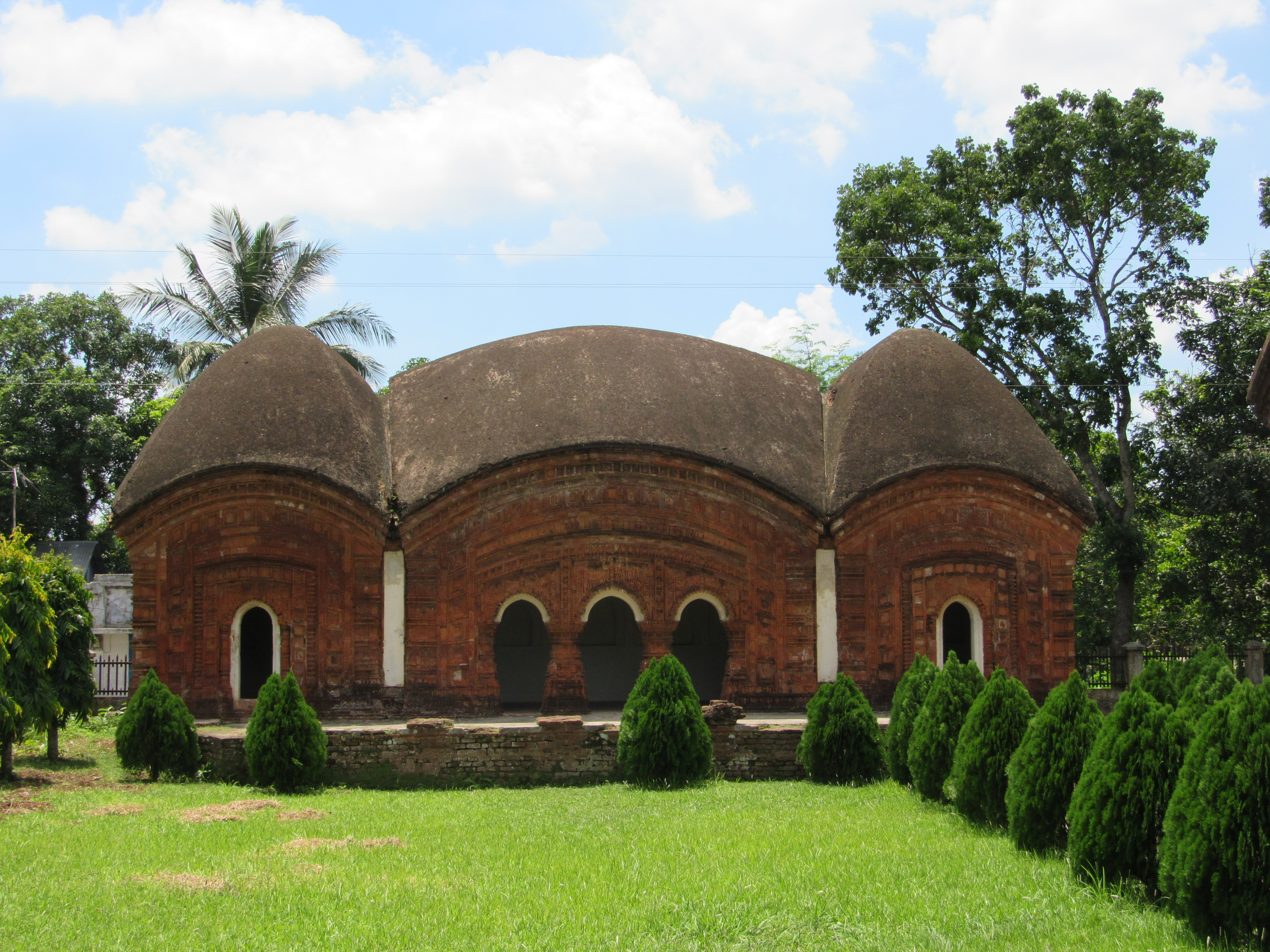

- Location within Bangladesh

Religion
- Affiliation: Hinduism

Location
- Location: Puthia
- State: Rajshahi
- Country: Bangladesh
- Interactive map of Bara Anhik Mandir
- Coordinates: 24.3323°N 88.8613°E

Bara Ahnik Mandir (Bengali: বড় আহ্নিক মন্দির) is a Hindu temple of the Puthia Temple Complex in Puthia Upazila, Rajshahi Division, Bangladesh. It stands next to Chauchala Chhota Govinda Mandir and faces east. It was built by the Rajas of Puthia. It follows a mixed form of Bengal temple architecture with a central Do Chala flanked with two Char Chala structures on both sides. The only other of known existence of something similar type in Bangladesh being Rajaram Mandir in Faridpur District.

== Location ==
Puthia town where the temple is located is accessible by road, 32 km away from Rajshahi town which is also a railhead. Rajshahi is located on the Dhaka Rajashahi Highway. The temple is located in a temple complex situated west of the Shyam Sagar lake. The walled complex complete with a garden also houses Chauchala Chhota Govinda Mandir and Gopal Mandir.

== Features ==
The temple is located facing the Char Ani Rajbari on the west bank of the Shyamsagar lake. The prominent feature is a triple archway in the centre, with an open platform. The temple "consists of three chambers, Do Chala in the center and attached two Char Chala in its north and south side", hence it is also called tri-mandir (three temples); dochala (two roof), meaning two roofs, and char-chala (four roofs) or chau-chala are either square or rectangular in shape with roof in the form of a hut with four sloping parts. The central do chala has a triple arched entrance and each of the two char chala section have a single arch entrance. It has a highly adorned front (eastern) facade with terracotta plaques and some of them are stated to be in dilapidated condition.

== Gallery ==
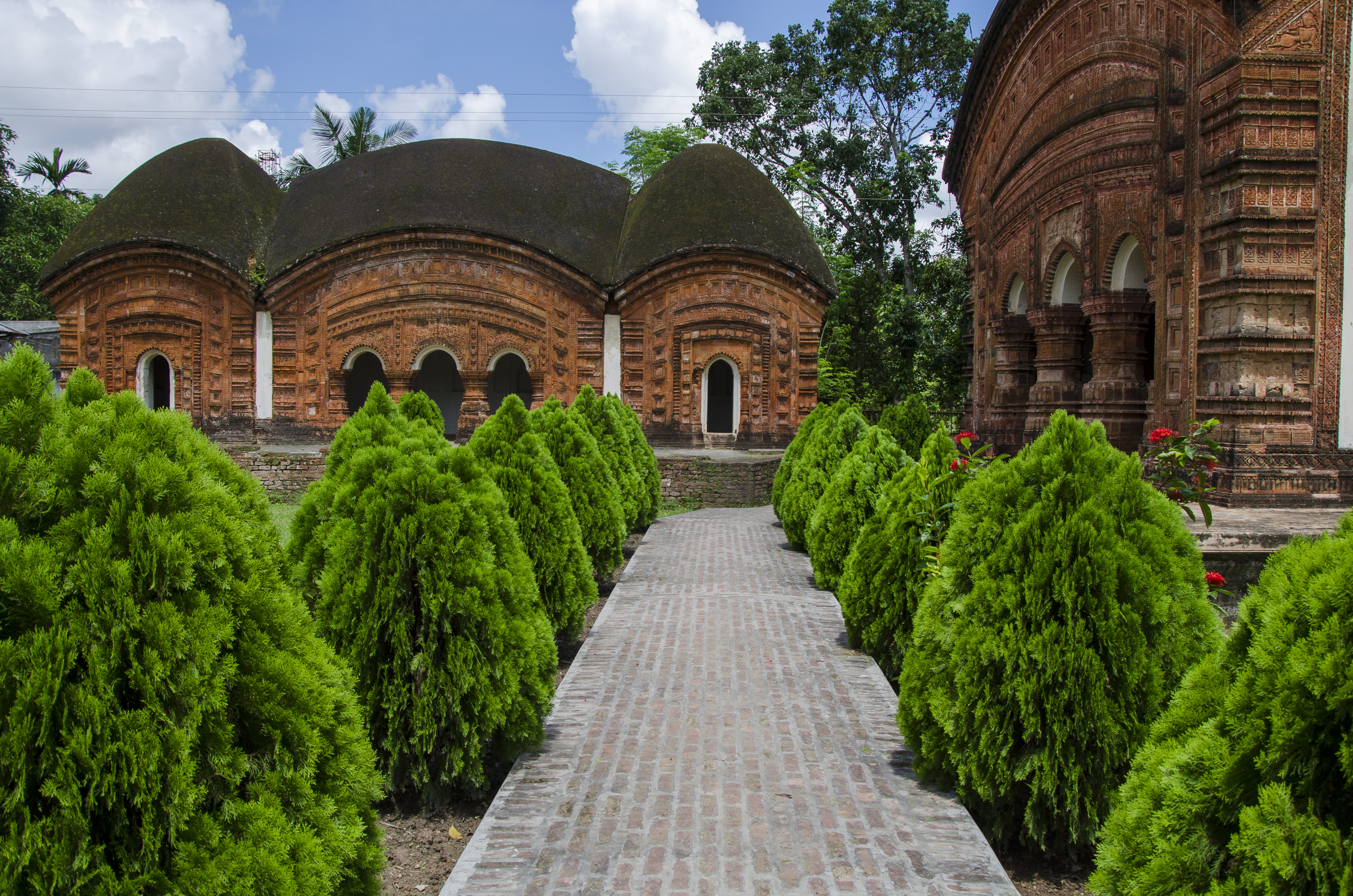
The road to the Bara Ahnik temple

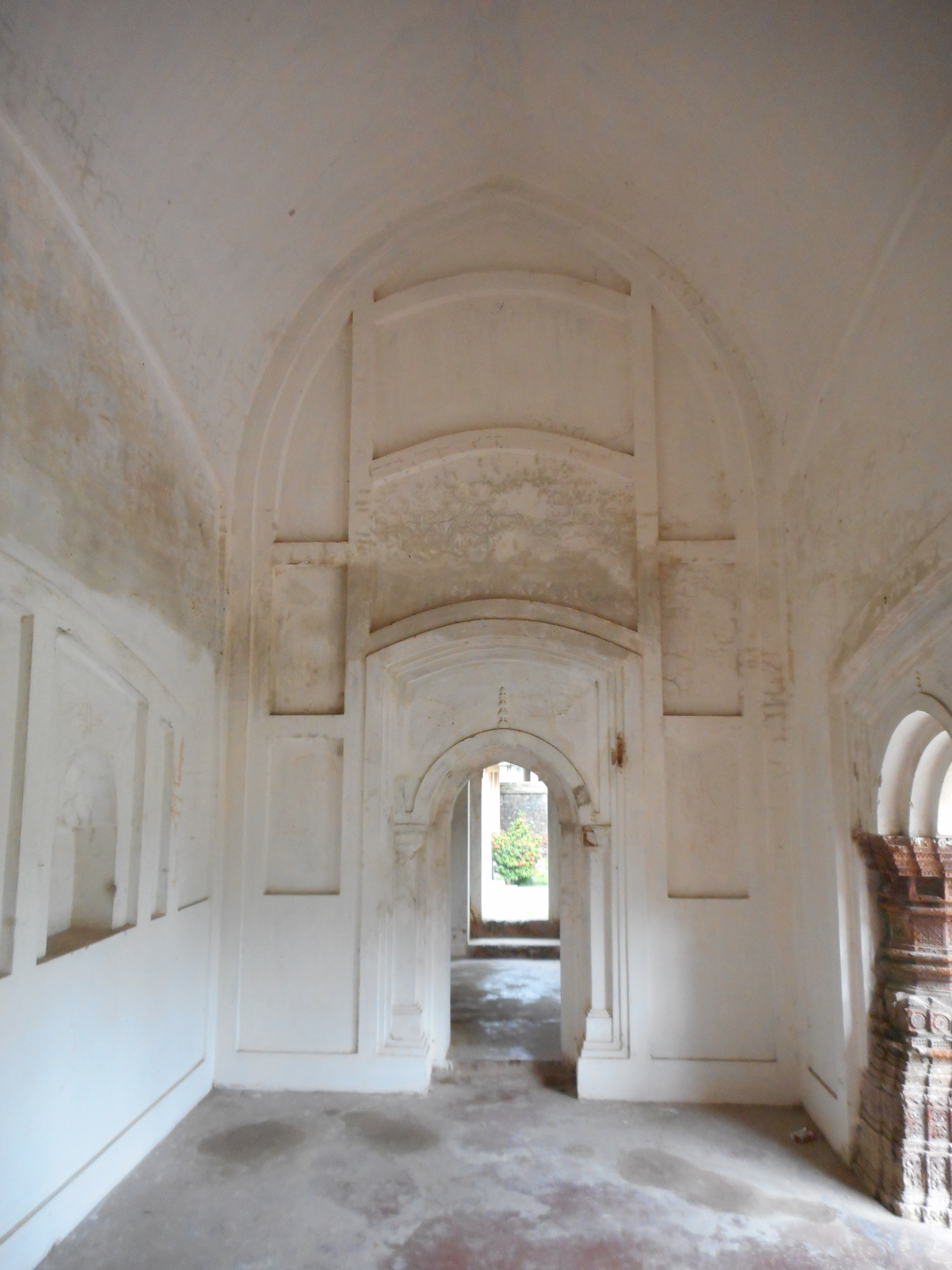
The inner part of the temple

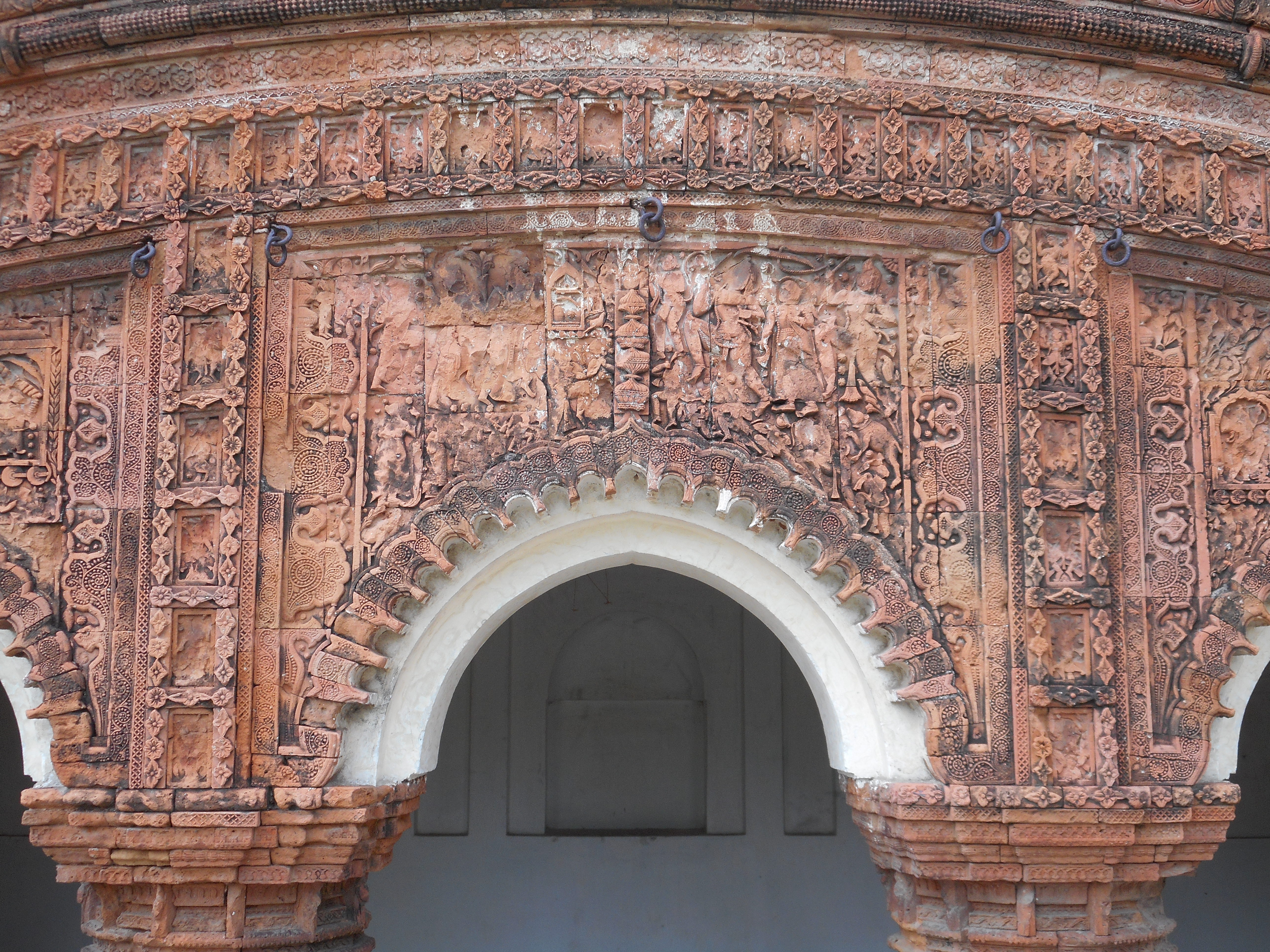
Decoration of earthen plates on the temple

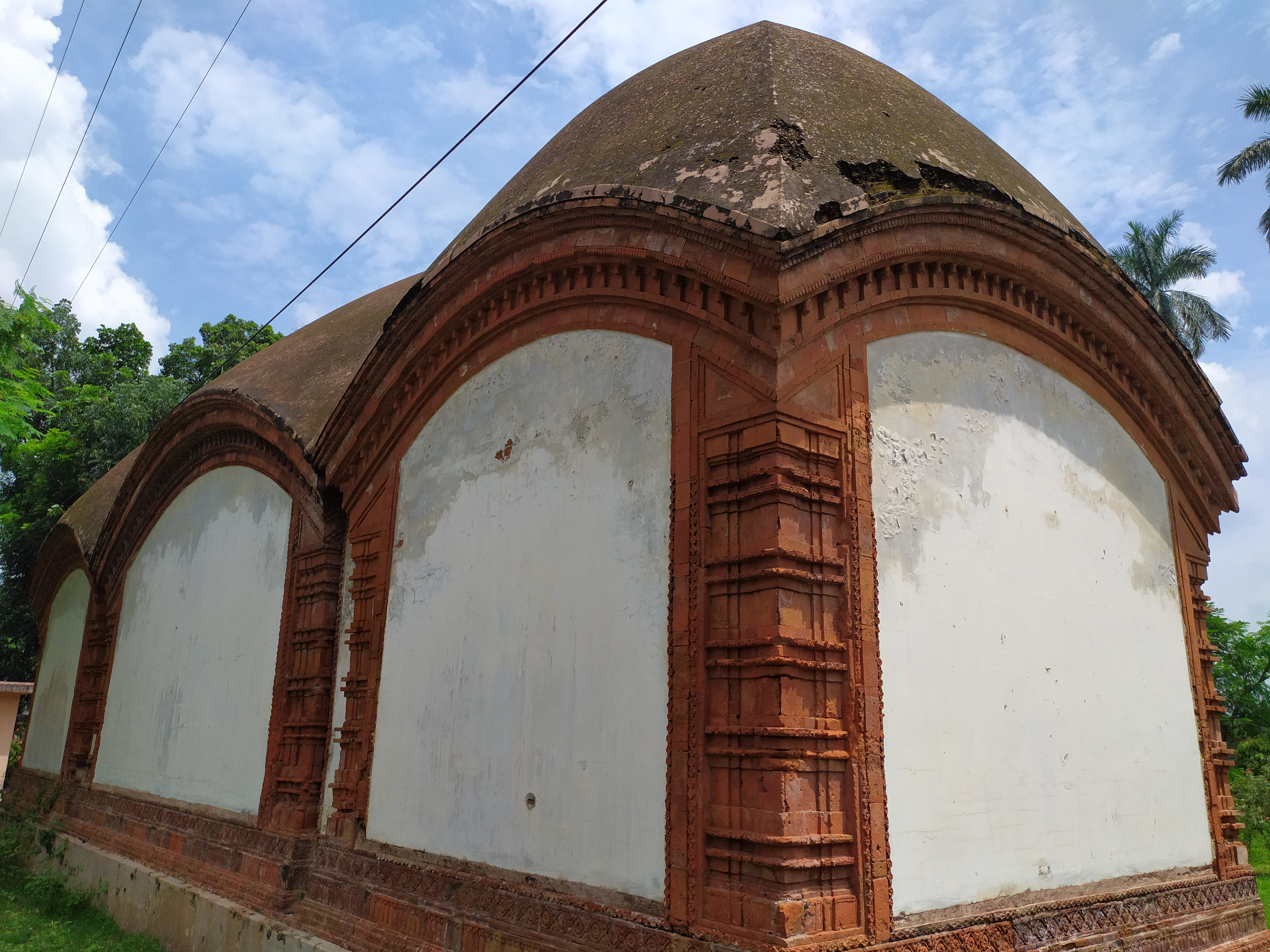
The back of the temple

== See also ==
- List of archaeological sites in Bangladesh
