= Tarapur Mandir =

Hindu temple in Bangladesh

Coordinates: 24.3710°N 88.8143°E

Tarapur Mandir is a Hindu temple of the Puthia Temple Complex in Puthia Upazila, Rajshahi Division, Bangladesh. Its construction is dated to the 18th century. It is also known by other names as Rath Bagicha Tarapur and Hawakhana among the local residents.

The temple is situated 3 kilometres (1.9 mi) to the west of the Puthia Rajbari. Access is from the Rajshahi-Natore road. The temple is in Puthia town which is 32 kilometres (20 mi) away by road from Rajshahi city; the city is also a rail head and is on the Dhaka Rajashahi Highway.

== Features ==
The temple, which faces to the east, is a double storied structure. It has a flat roof. It is built over a high raised plinth in the middle of a big pond, which is an unusual feature in Bangladesh. The structure is built in brick masonry. In the ground floor there is an oblong shaped cell which is enclosed within a gallery of small width. The frontage on the southern, northern and eastern side of the temple in the ground floor has three arches in each face. The first floor of the temple has only one chamber and the facade on this floor also has triple arches on the southern, northern and eastern sides. The interior and external walls of the temple are simply plastered without any decoration, except for a few panels on the external face which have decorations. The temple and the pond are in a state of ruin.
