= Boro Kali Bari Temple =

Hindu temple in Bangladesh

Coordinates: 24.7554°N 90.4143°E

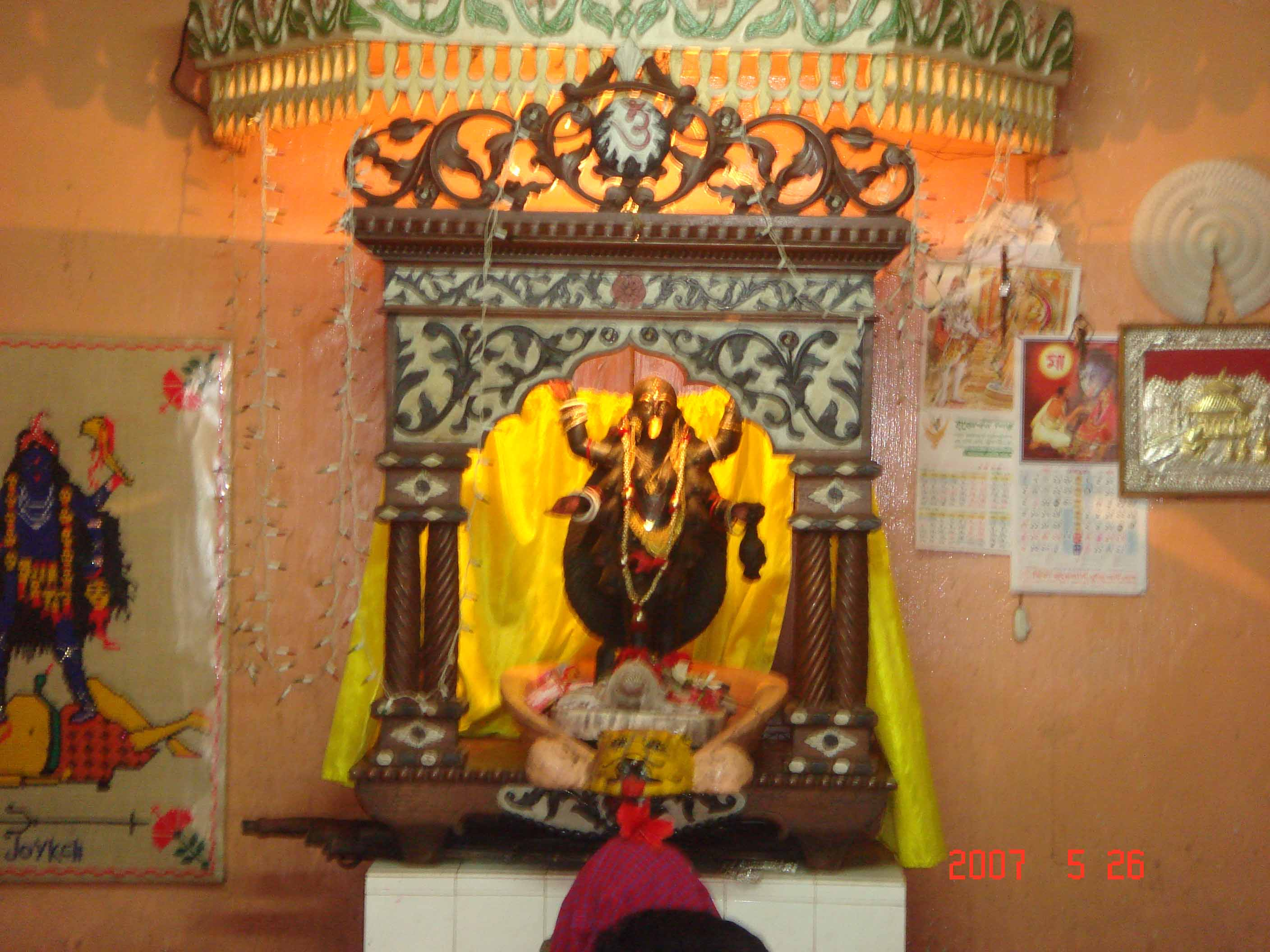
The idol of Goddess Kali in the Boro Kali Bari Temple

Boro Kali Bari is one of the oldest and most important Hindu temples located in the city of Mymensingh, Bangladesh. The temple is dedicated to the Goddess Kali.

The main festival is Kali Puja, which is celebrated every year. Every year on this festival, a lot of devotees visit this temple. After 2012, the Kali Bari Kings Club participated by presenting a themed pandal to the visitors, which defines many unknown Hindu mythological stories. They are the first committee to introduce and define their pandal with mythological themes. Nowadays, other clubs follow suit and want to introduce themselves with themes. Durga Puja, Lakshmi Puja, Saraswati Puja and Manasa Puja are also celebrated every year in this temple. The temple is located at a 10-minute rickshaw pull from the center of the city (Ganginapar Mour). Hindu devotees can visit this temple from morning until night. However, the daily puja usually starts after sunset. Different types of sweets are available to purchase near the Kali temple. Other important Hindu temples in Mymensingh are the Durga Bari, Thanarghat Shiv, Dashabhuja Bari, Shiv Bari, and Bishwanath temples, also located in the heart of the city.

History

The History of Boro Kalibari Temple

The Boro Kalibari Temple was established approximately 300 years ago during the reign of Nawab Alivardi Khan. The temple was founded by Tantric bandits. The deity, Goddess Kali, was consecrated here on a Narimunda (human skull) and Panchamundi (five-skull) altar. The Goddess of this temple is famously known as "Joy Kali."

The Legend and History

Behind this name lies a story from 300 years ago. On the banks of the Brahmaputra River, a black stone (Kastipathar) idol of Goddess Kali was caught in a fisherman's net. Upon seeing the idol, the fisherman began chanting "Joy Kali! Joy Kali!" Since then, the deity has been known by that name.

The fisherman later handed the idol over to the Tantrics. The current Panchamundi altar was once the site of a large Banyan tree. During that era, a small thatched hut was built under that tree, and the Mother Goddess was consecrated there according to Tantric rituals.

Present

Boro Kalibari Temple newly repair and from 20th March 2026 this temple now run with a new idol of Ma Kali.That Black Stone old idol replace by a big idol Ma Kali which is made by Cement and Ganesh Temple,Bipadnashini Temple added after new construction.

Festival (Diwali)

From 2013 Kalibari Kings Club arrange Theme pandel and organise programs road show.In 2025 they celebrate 1 era of Kali Puja.
