= Chauchala Chhota Govinda Mandir =

Hindu Temple in Bangladesh

Coordinates: 24.3623°N 88.8349°E

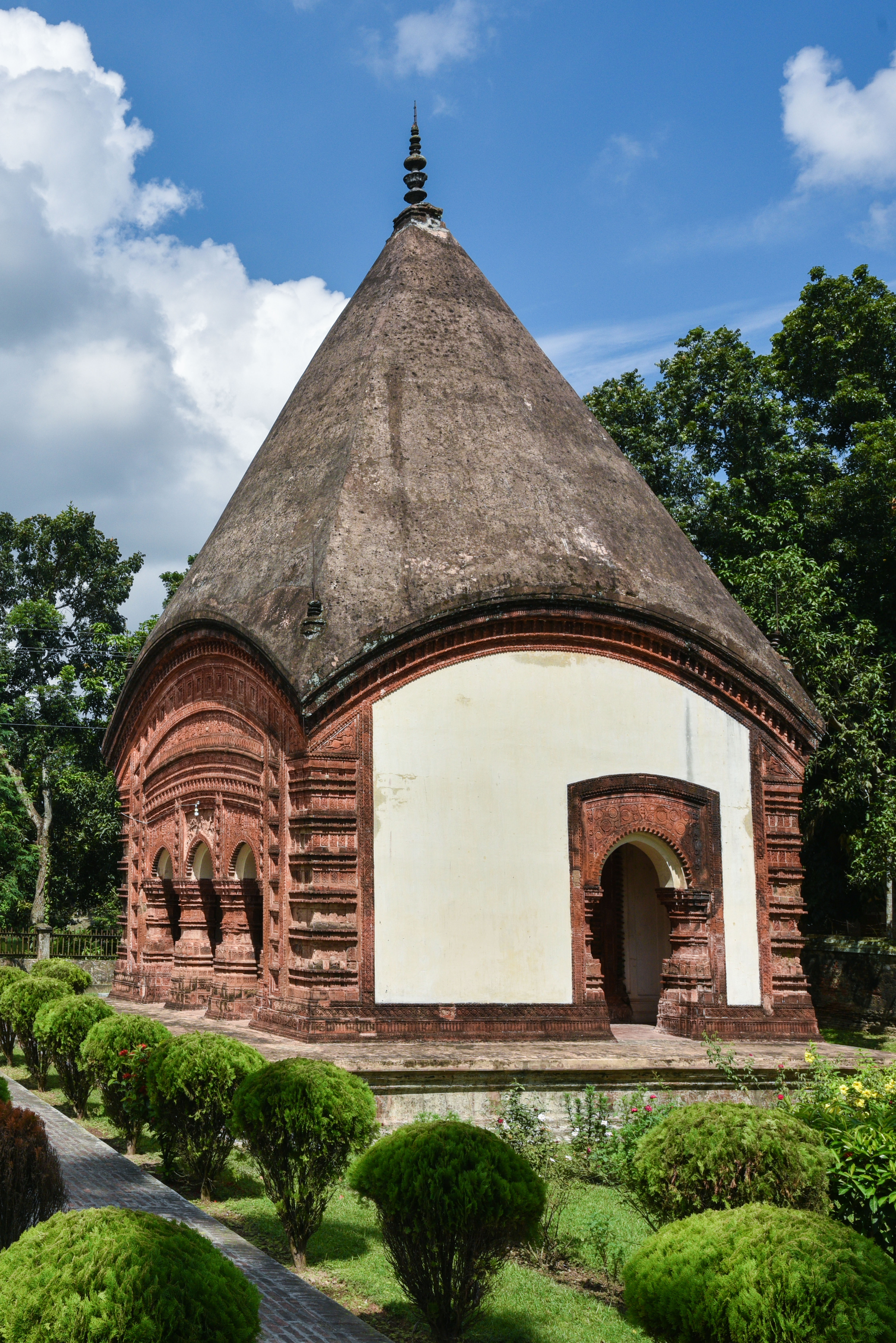
Chota Govinda Temple, Puthia

Chauchala Chhota Govinda Mandir is a Hindu temple of the Puthia Temple Complex in Puthia Upazila, Rajshahi Division, Bangladesh. The temple is believed to date to the 1790s-1800s period.

The temple is in Puthia town which is 32 kilometres (20 mi) away by road from Rajshahi city; the city is also a rail head and is on the Dhaka Rajashahi Highway.

== Features ==
The temple stands next to the Bara Ahnik Mandir on a high platform, covered with a pyramid shaped vault. The temple's interior has one chamber with porches on the eastern and southern directions. The southern frontage is extensively decorated with terracotta plaques, which depict ten incarnations Avatars of Vishnu, Lankakanda a chapter in the epic Ramayana legend, Radha-Krishna epic stories, flower designs and geometric art and scenes of the civic life of the period. The frontage on the west has terracotta ornamentation panels some of which are in a dilapidated condition or pilfered.

== Gallery ==
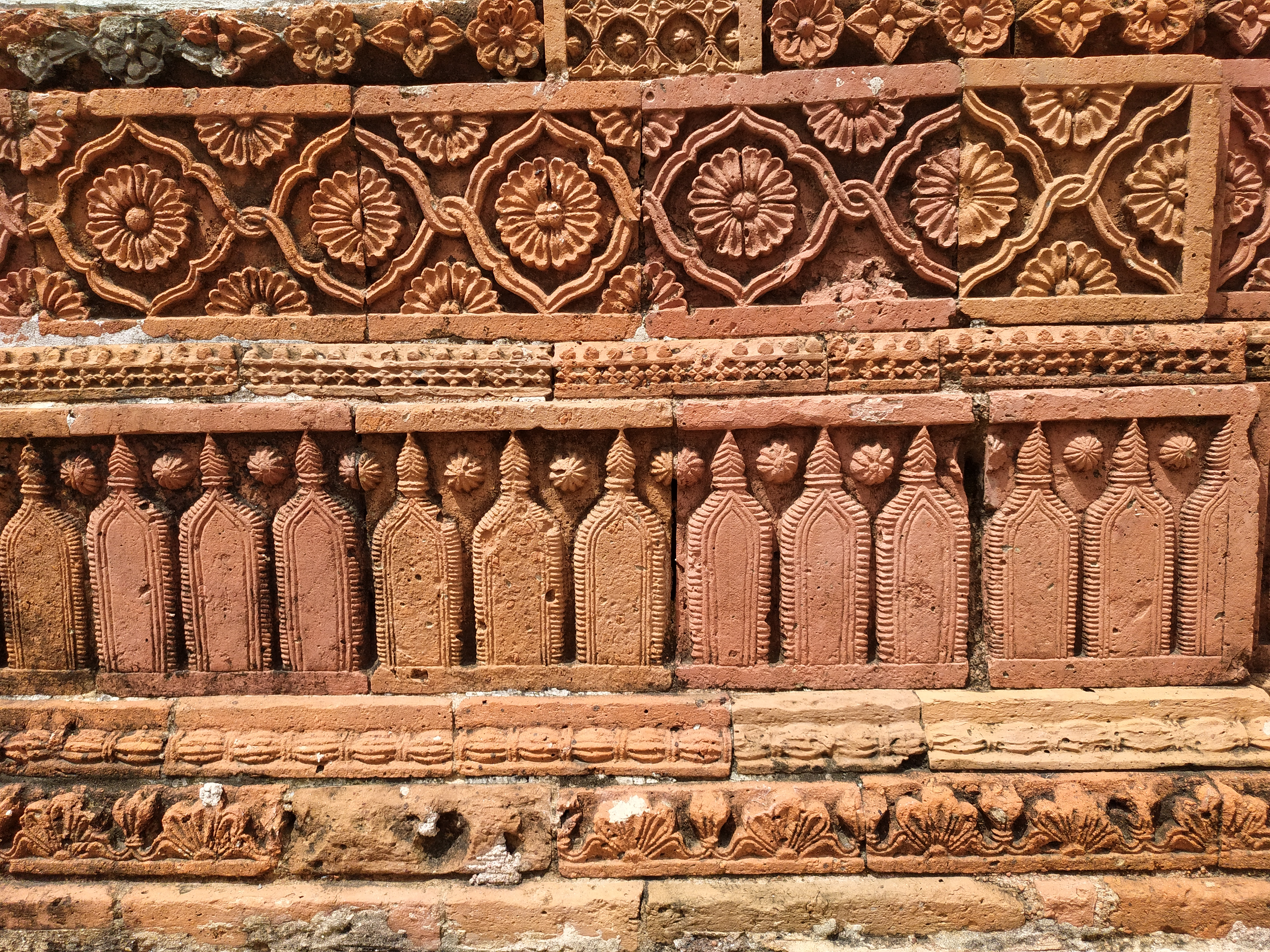
Terracotta

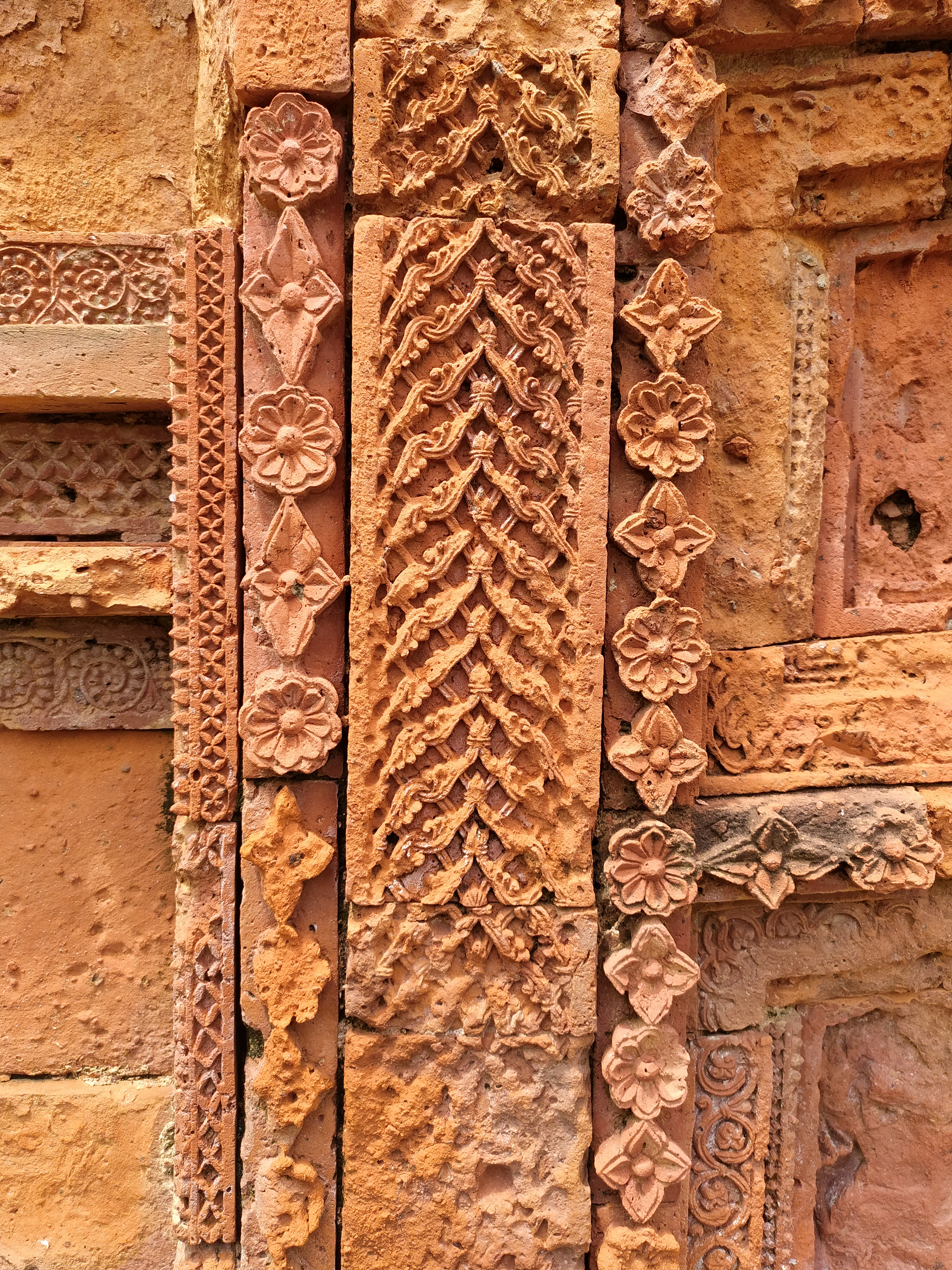
Terracotta

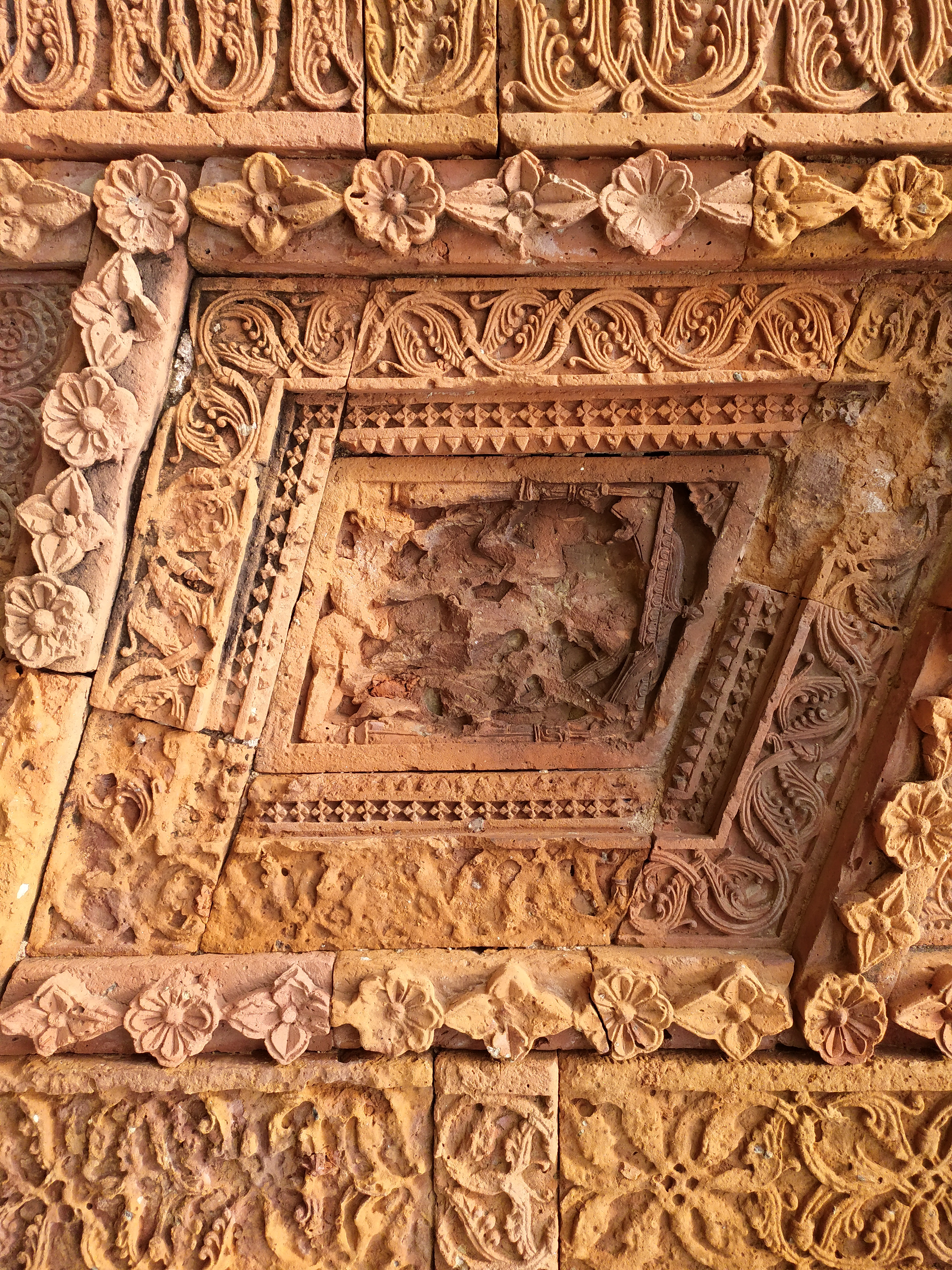
Terracotta

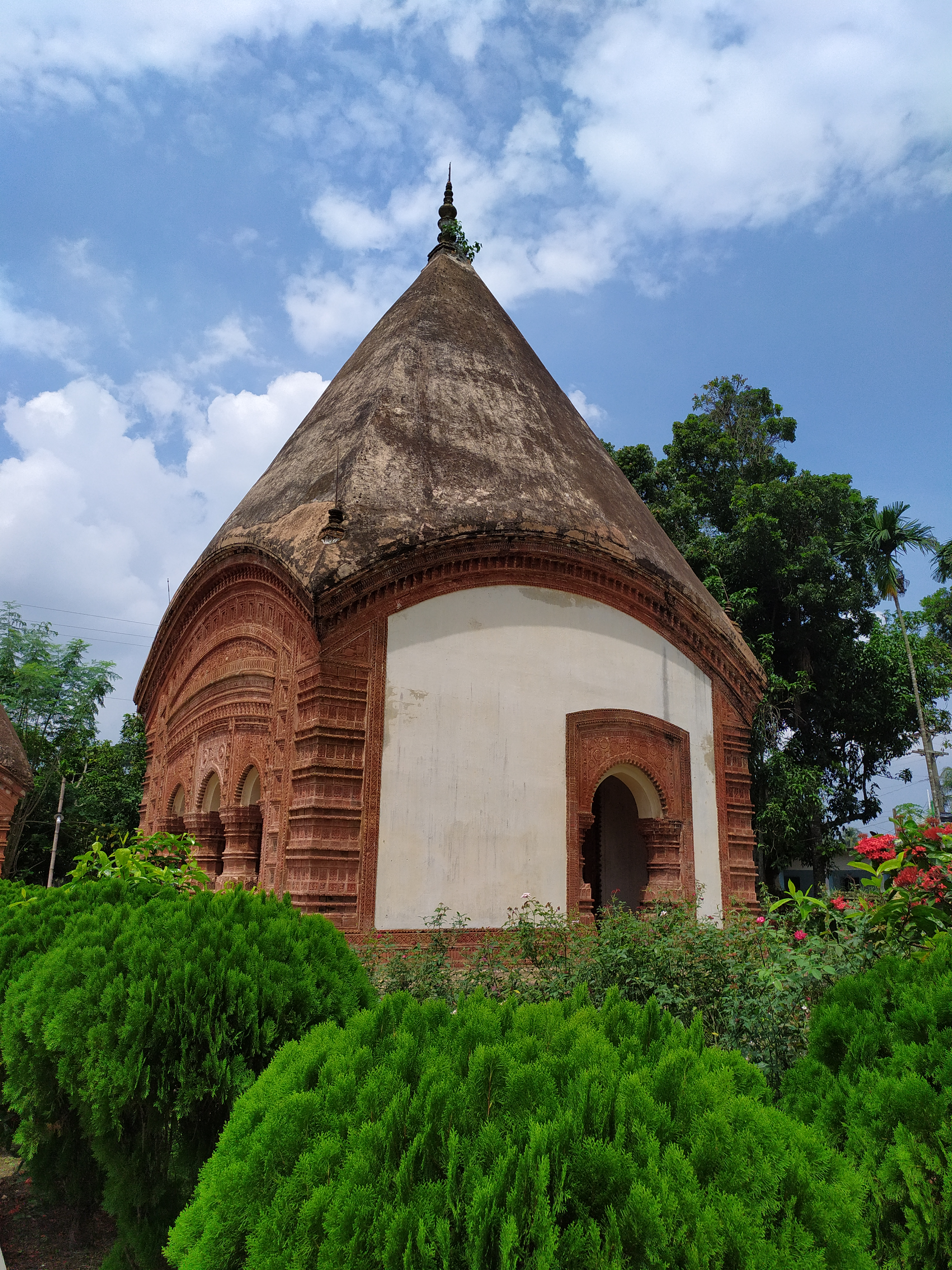
Temple
