= Dhopapara =

Dhopapara ধোপাপাড়া
- Village
- Location in Bangladesh
- Coordinates: 24.4072°N 88.8551°E
- Country: Bangladesh
- Division: Rajshahi Division
- District: Rajshahi District
- Upazila: Puthia

Area
  - Total: 10.64 km^{2} (4.11 sq mi)

Population (2001)
  - Total: 6,897
  - Density: 648.2/km^{2} (1,679/sq mi)
- Time zone: UTC+6 (BST)
- Postal code: 6260

Dhopapara is a village in Puthia Upazila, Bangladesh. In the village are one college, Dhopapara Memorial Degree College, and two high schools: Dhopapara High School and Dhopapara Girls High School. This is a big village and it has a big market.
