= Chhota Shiva Mandir =

Hindu temple in Bangladesh

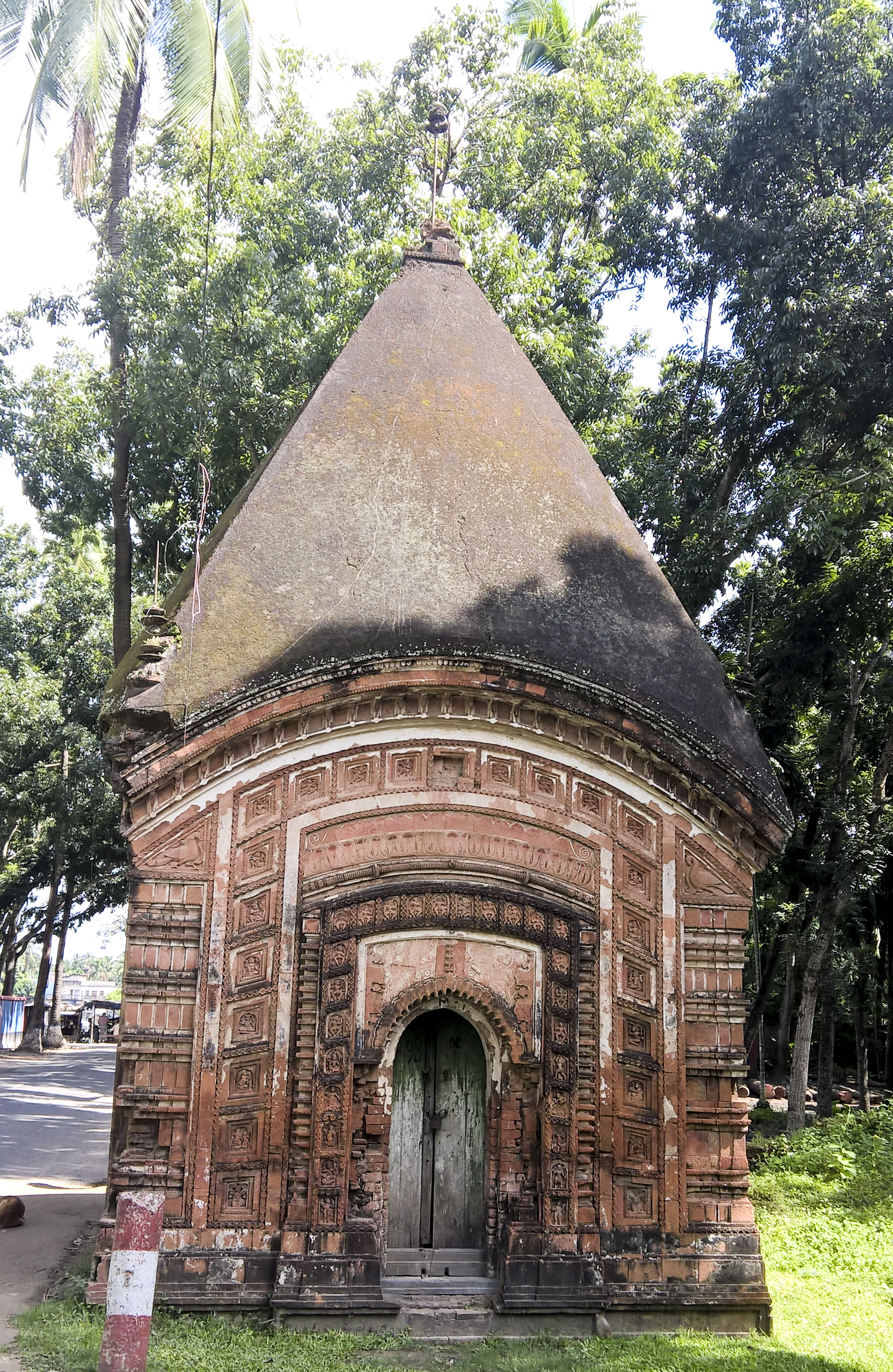
Chota Shiva Temple

Chhota Shiva Mandir is a Hindu temple of the Puthia Temple Complex in Puthia Upazila, Rajshahi Division, Bangladesh. The temple, built in 1804, is credited to Raja Anandanarayan of the Chauddapai.

The temple is in Puthia town which is 32 kilometres (20 mi) away by road from Rajshahi city; the city is also a rail head and is on the Dhaka Rajashahi Highway. It is located at the southwestern end of PanchAni palace, on the eastern side of Arani road.

== Features ==
The temple is oriented towards south and has only one chamber with a roof which is in semi-circular shape. The temple's roof is pyramidal, a chuachala (in the form of a hut with four slanting parts) with a curved cornice. The only entrance facing south has ornamentation made in terracotta panels which have carvings of dances of deities of Vasihnava sect of Hindu religion.
