= Gopal Mandir =

Krishna temple in India

Gopal Mandir also called as Dwarkadhish temple is the second largest temple of Ujjain after Mahakaleshwar and is dedicated to Lord Krishna, in Ujjain City, Ujjain Division, Madhya Pradesh, India. It was built by Bayaji bai Shinde, the wife of Maratha King Daulatrao Scindia in the 19th century in Maratha Style. It is located in the main market of Ujjain.

The temple is in Ujjain town which is 65 km away from Indore city; the city is situated in Madhya Pradesh.

== Features ==
The main temple has a two-feet tall statue of Lord Krishna made up of silver coated marble. In addition to Lord Krishna's idol, there are also idols of Lord Shiva, Parvati and Garuda. Janmashtami and Harihar Parva are celebrated with great pomp in this temple complex. In the Harihar Parva, images of Mahakaleshwar jyotirlinga are brought in to meet Lord Krishna. The doors of Gopal Mandir are said to have been stolen by Mahmud of Ghazni. These were later restored by Mahadji Scindia.

== See also ==
- Ujjain
