= Gopalganj Twin Temple =

Hindu temple in Bangladesh

The Gopalganj Twin Temple consist of two Hindu temples located in the Gopalganj village in Dinajpur Sadar Upazila, Dinajpur District, Bangladesh. They are located 6 kilometres (3.7 mi) north of Dinajpur city, which is the headquarter of the district.

== History ==
According to a dating provided by David J McCutchen, one of the two temples was built in 1743, while the second temple was built in 1754. It is also said that one of the stone inscriptions from this temple complex is now housed in the Dinajpur Museum as the inscription records that the temple was built by Raja Ramnath (1722-1752) in 1676 Shaka era corresponding to 1754 AD, which corresponds to the date of building the second temple. It is also conjectured that the scripts on the inscriptions have similarity with the scripts seen in the Kantanaga temple.

== Features ==
One of the twin temple's structure has twenty five spires (ratnas) with twelve facets. The other temple, which is in a quadrangular shape, has five spires. But the temples are in state of ruin. The temple blocks have been dismantled and used in buildings built in the vicinity resulting in instability to the temple structures.
