= Joy Kali Temple =

Hindu temple in Dhaka, Bangladesh

Coordinates: 23.7216°N 90.4167°E

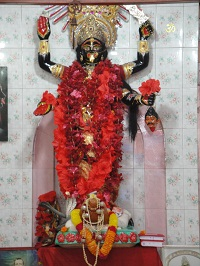
The statue of Goddess Kali inside the Joy Kali Temple in Old Dhaka

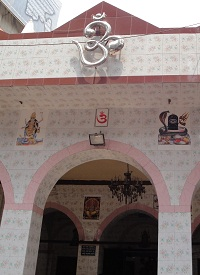
The entrance to the Joy Kali Temple is welcomed by this Hindu spell 'Om'

The Temple of Joy Kali (Bengali: জয় কালী মন্দির) in Dhaka, Bangladesh, is situated between Thathari Bazar and Wari, on a road itself named after this temple, at 24 Joy Kali Temple street. Joy Kali Temple is a Hindu temple devoted to Goddess Kali Ma. People of the Hindu religion of every age come to this temple to worship Goddess Kali. The statue of Goddess Kali is of great significance to the Hindus. The visitors and committee members of this temple gather money for occasions, where sweets are later distributed among them, which is called 'Prasad'.

== History ==
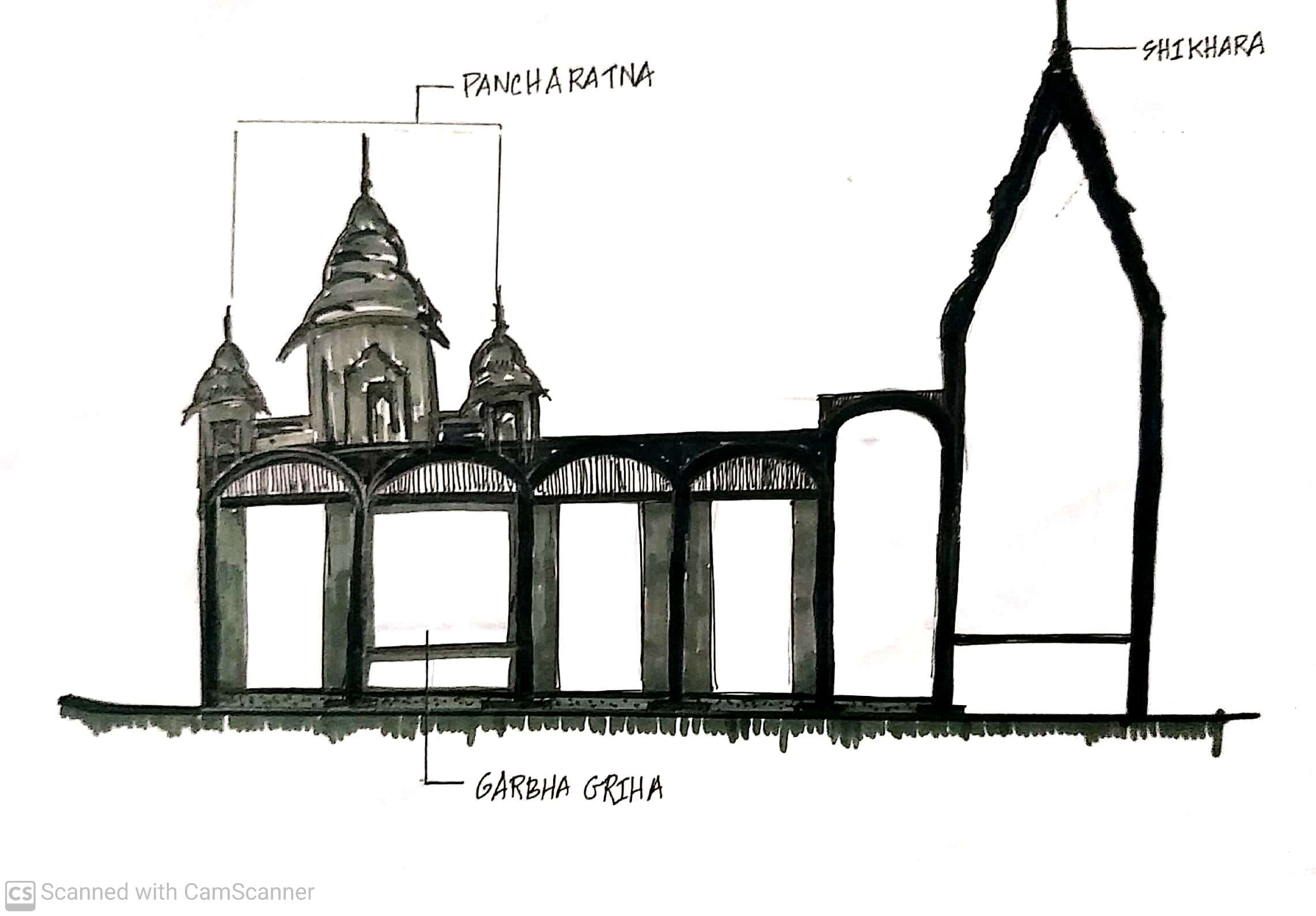
assume section of the temple from present condition of the site

This temple is about 400 years old, established in the Bengali year 1001. During the reign of the Nawabs, Dewans Tulsi Narayan Ghosh and Nabh Narayan Ghosh founded the temple under the guidance of the saint Bancharam. At that time, they installed twenty-one statues of deities, including Shib, Kali, Lakshminarayan, three Shalgram Chakra, and Bandurga, among others.

Several beautiful monuments were built in the house of Joy Kali, such as the Pancharatna, Nabratna, temple of Shiv, and a guest house. Markets like the Nawabpur Joy Kali Bazar and another located to the south of Kaliganj Hut were also dedicated to Joy Kali Devi.

The temple may be divided into three linear spaces, separated by thick walls and columns made of terracotta, which reflect the gods' history. All spaces were mainly open to emphasize the sanctum sanctorum (garbha ghriha), the sacred core of the temple. The shikhara also features terracotta artwork which also shows divine activities.

== Present condition ==
The temple is now approximately 300.64 m^{2}. The first priest of this Joy Kali Temple was Bancharam Saint; the third priest was Panachenand, who suffered a decline. The responsibility to serve the Devi and the temple was done through lineage. The Brahmin priests were Ram Jagannath Chakraborty, Krishna Chandra Chakraborty and Abonimohan Chraborty. The last priest in this lineage was Khitish Chandra Chakraborty, who died in 1977 due to cancer. Starting from that time, the temple started to erode, due to lack of maintenance and shortage of money. This temple was damaged during the strike of the 1990's. The temple was renovated later on by Goddess Kali's followers. Now the temple is much smaller than it was when it was first established. The temple was burgled and valuables looted by thieves in 2010.

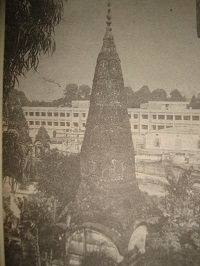
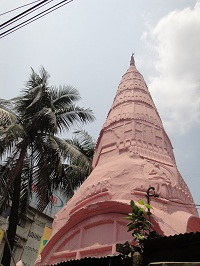

The dome of Joy Kali Temple in the old days and the present days

== Architectural significance ==
Inside the boundary of this temple there are basically two temples. One of the temples is of Kali Devi, the other one, which has a dome, is of Shiv. The dome is made out of plaster and is visible from the outside. Locals of that area refer to this dome as the Joy Kali Temple. The front of the temple complex is a busy stop for human haulers that go into old Dhaka. The temple has tiles on the walls all around, and the floor is made out of mosaic. There are pictures of Hindu Gods and Goddesses printed on the tiled walls of the temple. The entrance to the temple is welcomed by a logo made of stainless steel saying 'Om'- which is a Hindu divine symbol. In front of the Kali Devi statue is a bell hanging from above. It is a ritual to ring the bell after entering the temple and before leaving. Joy kali temple might be a square-shaped structure with columns which are heavy thick material and also a thick border in the lower part of the column. For this reason, it might be strong and have its structure now after 400 years and also have one shikhara. One of the temples is of kali devi, the other one, which has a shikhara, is of shiv. Basically, the temples were built with general form, as there are 2 garbha griha for 2 gods. One is on the north side, another is on the east side, and antarala, which can be similar to typical of north Indian temple, then mandapa, and ardho mandapa after entrance for worshipers. And the upper walls are arched-shaped. The south side have on main entrance. On its right side, there is a place for holy basil.

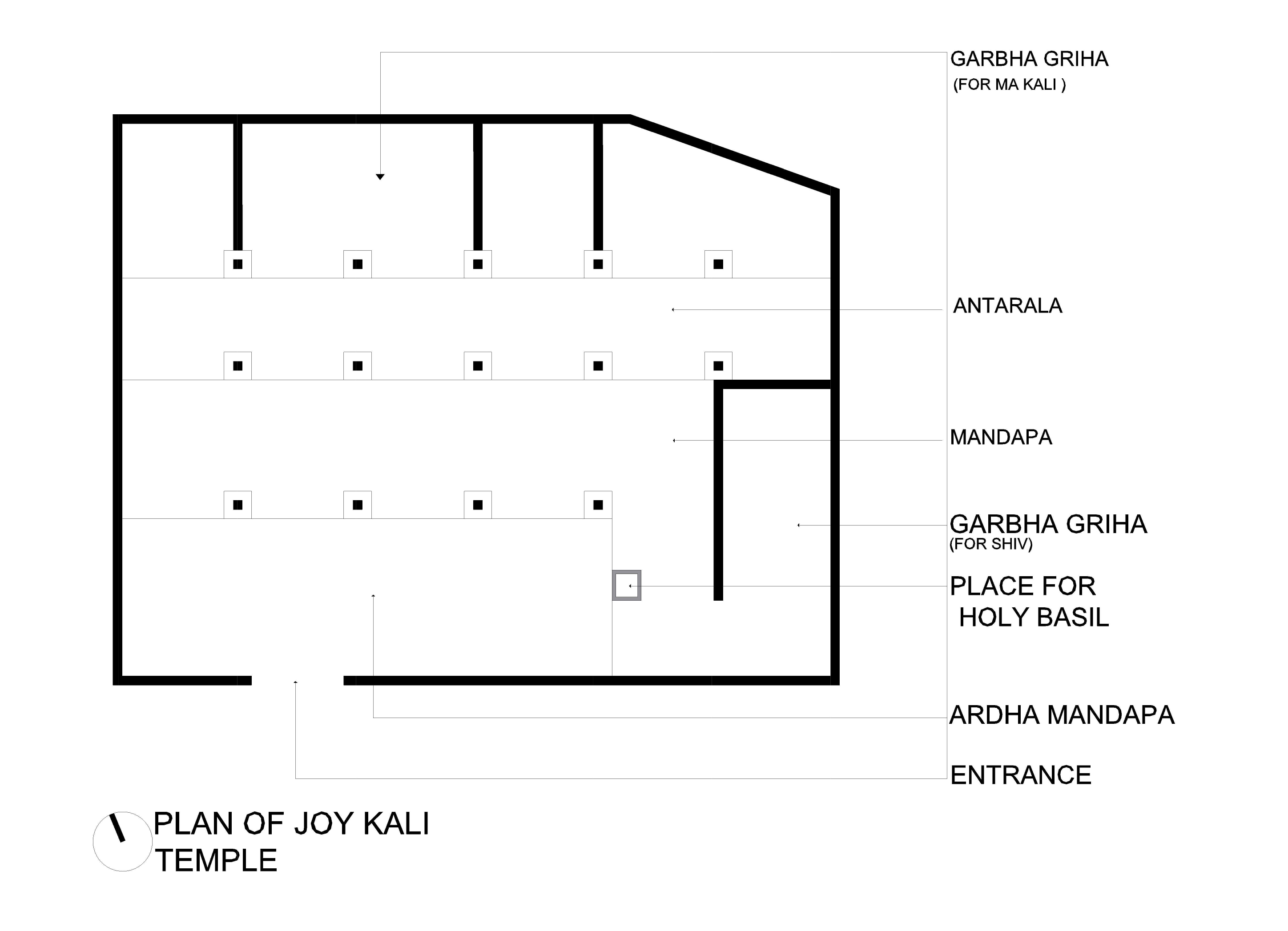
assume this plan from present structure of the temple
