= Kaliya jue Temple =

Hindu temple in Bangladesh

Coordinates: 25.7905°N 88.6667°E

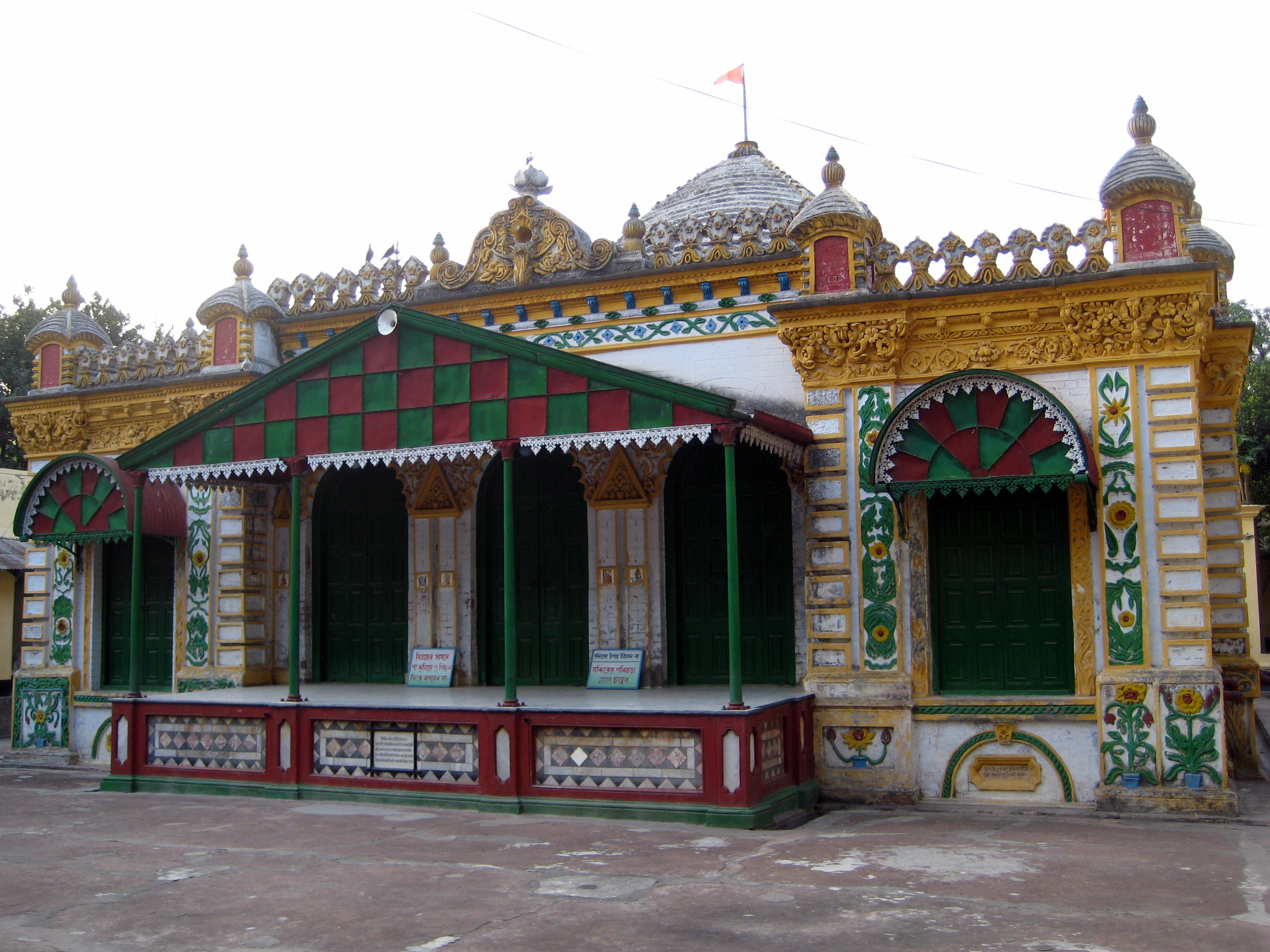
Kaliya jue Temple

Kaliya jue Temple (Bengali: কালিয়া জীউ মন্দির) dedicated to the Hindu God Krishna is located in the town of Dinajpur, Bangladesh. The temple is situated to the west side of the Dinajpur Rajbari.
