= Lalmai Chandi Temple =

Hindu temple in Cumilla District, Bangladesh

Coordinates: 23.3533°N 91.1318°E

- লালমাই চন্ডী মন্দির
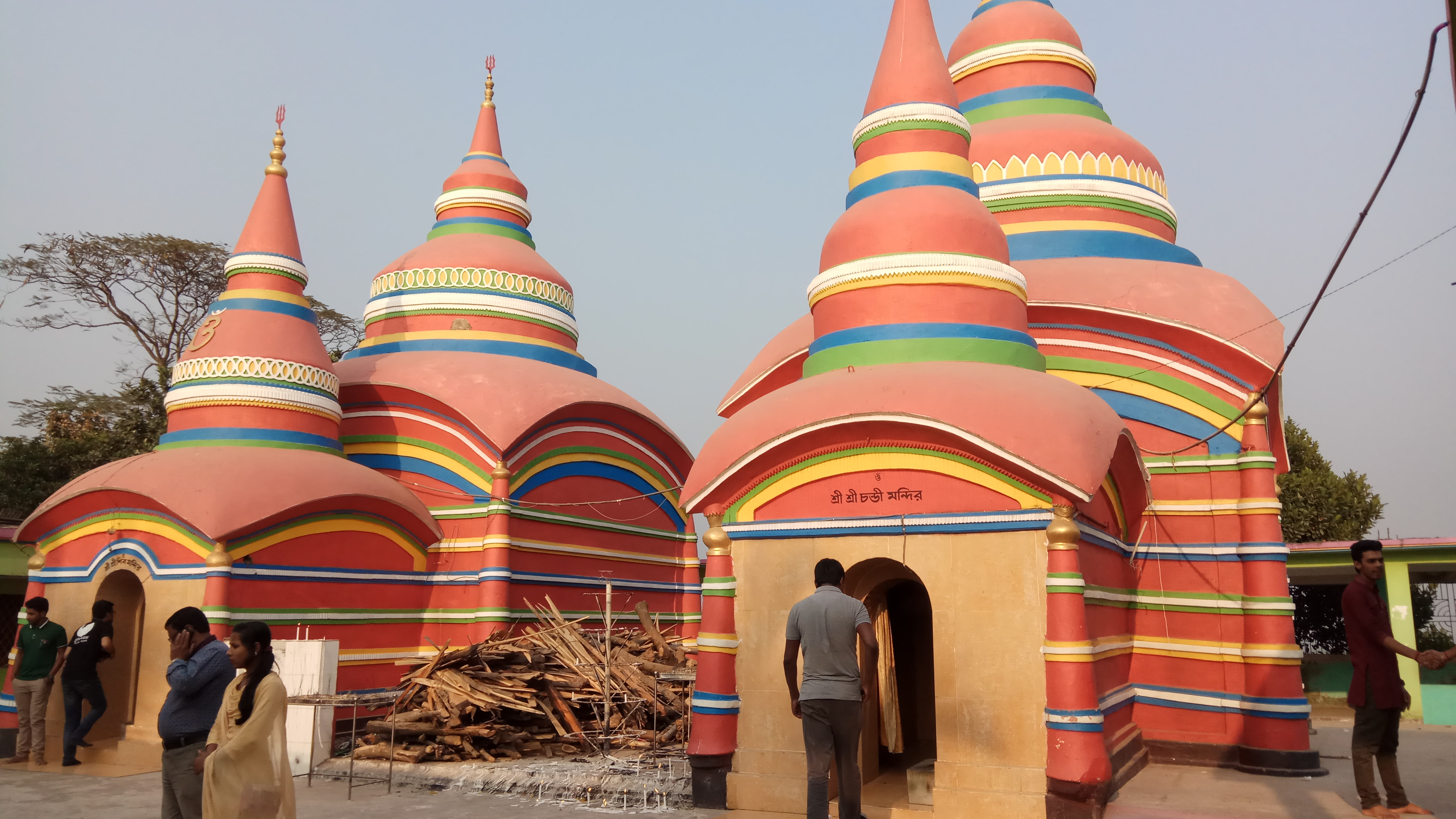

- Location within Bangladesh

Religion
- Affiliation: Hinduism
- District: Comilla District
- Province: Chittagong Division
- Deity: Kali

Location
- Location: Barura Upazila
- Country: Bangladesh
- Interactive map of Lalmai Chandi Temple

Architecture
- Founder: Rani Probhaboti
- Established: 7th century

Lalmai Chandi Temple (Bengali: লালমাই চন্ডী মন্দির), also called Chandimura Mandir, is an ancient Hindu temple located on the summit of the Lalmai hill in Barura Upazila of Comilla District, Bangladesh. The temple is dedicated to the Goddess Kali. There is a temple dedicated to the God Shiva nearby.

== History ==
Establishment: 7th century by Rani Probhaboti, wife of Buddhist Moharaj.

First renovation: 17th-century reformer and excavator of Dutia Deeghi, Diteea Debi, niece of Moharaj Manikko Bahadur, king of Tripura .

Second renovation: 1972–1973 Reformer and development organizer: Swami Atmanada Geeri Moharaj.
