= Sindurmati Tirthadham =

- সিন্দুরমতি তীর্থধাম
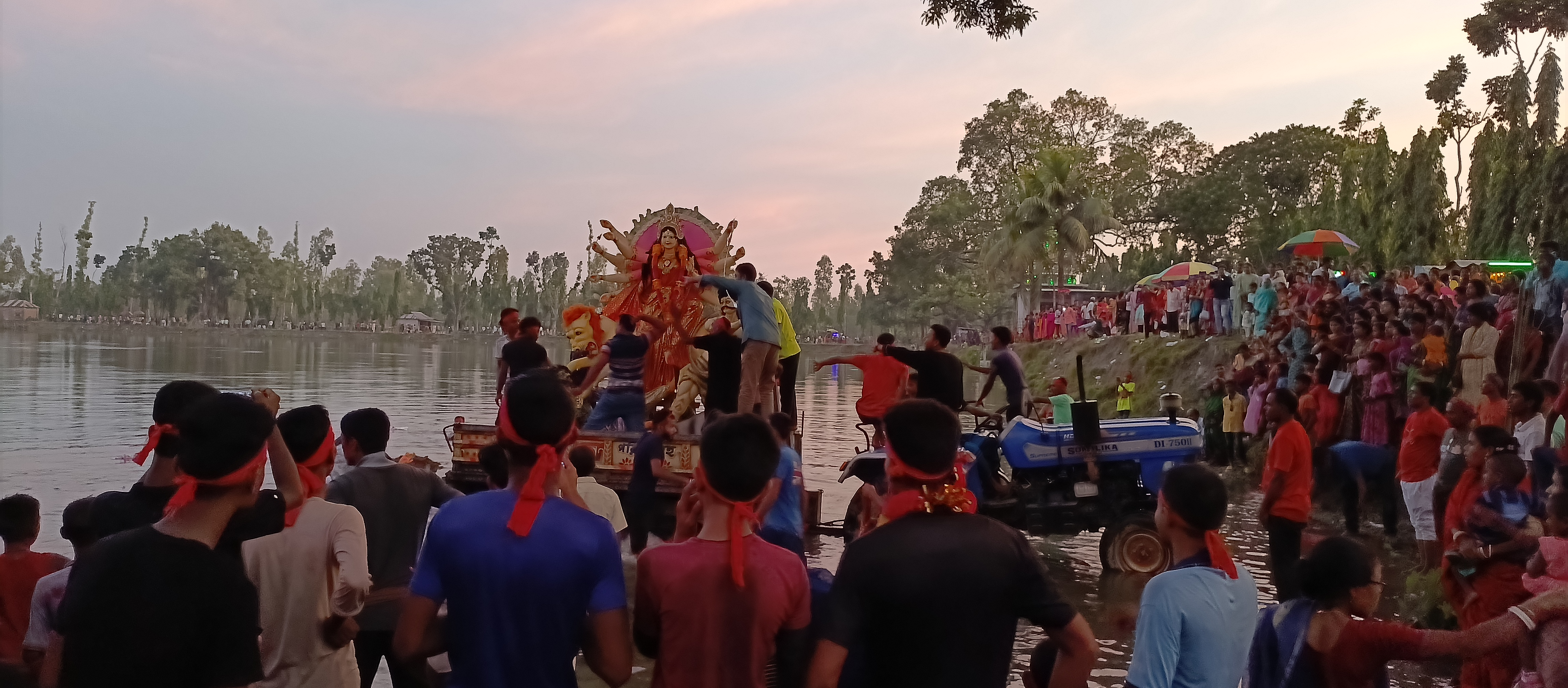
- Vijaya Dashami 2023

- Location within Rangpur division Location within Bangladesh

Religion
- Affiliation: Hinduism
- District: On the border of Kurigram district and Lalmonirhat district
- Festivals: Durga Puja, Rama Navami & Kali Puja

Location
- Country: Bangladesh
- Interactive map of Sindurmati Tirthadham
- Coordinates: 25.813059°N 89.517111°E

Architecture
- Founder: Zamidar Raj Narayan Chakraborty

Sindurmati Tirthadham is located on the border of Kurigram district and Lalmonirhat district in Sindurmati Mauza on 16.5 acres of land. Dighi is a sacred pilgrimage site for Hindus. During the renovation of this dighi in 1975 by government initiative, many ancient coins and idols were found which are now preserved in the Bangladesh National Museum.

== History and nomenclature ==
It is said that a Hindu Zamindar Raj Narayan Chakraborty dug this lake to have a child. When her two daughters were born, they were named Sindur and Moti. But after the excavation of the pond was completed, it was seen that the water was not rising. After realizing his dream, the zamindar organized a puja on the Navami day. The puja was organized right in the middle of the Dighi. His two daughters Sindur and Moti were staying there. Before the end of the puja, the water started to rise suddenly. Even though everyone got ashore, Sindur and Moti sank in the water. Later the zamindar dreamt that his two daughters would attain divinity immortality. Over time, the name of the lake became Sindurmati.

== Temples ==
Temples established in Sindurmati Dighi:

- Durga Temple
- Krishna Temple
- Vishnu Temple
- Rama Temple
- Kali Temple

== Sindurmati Fair ==
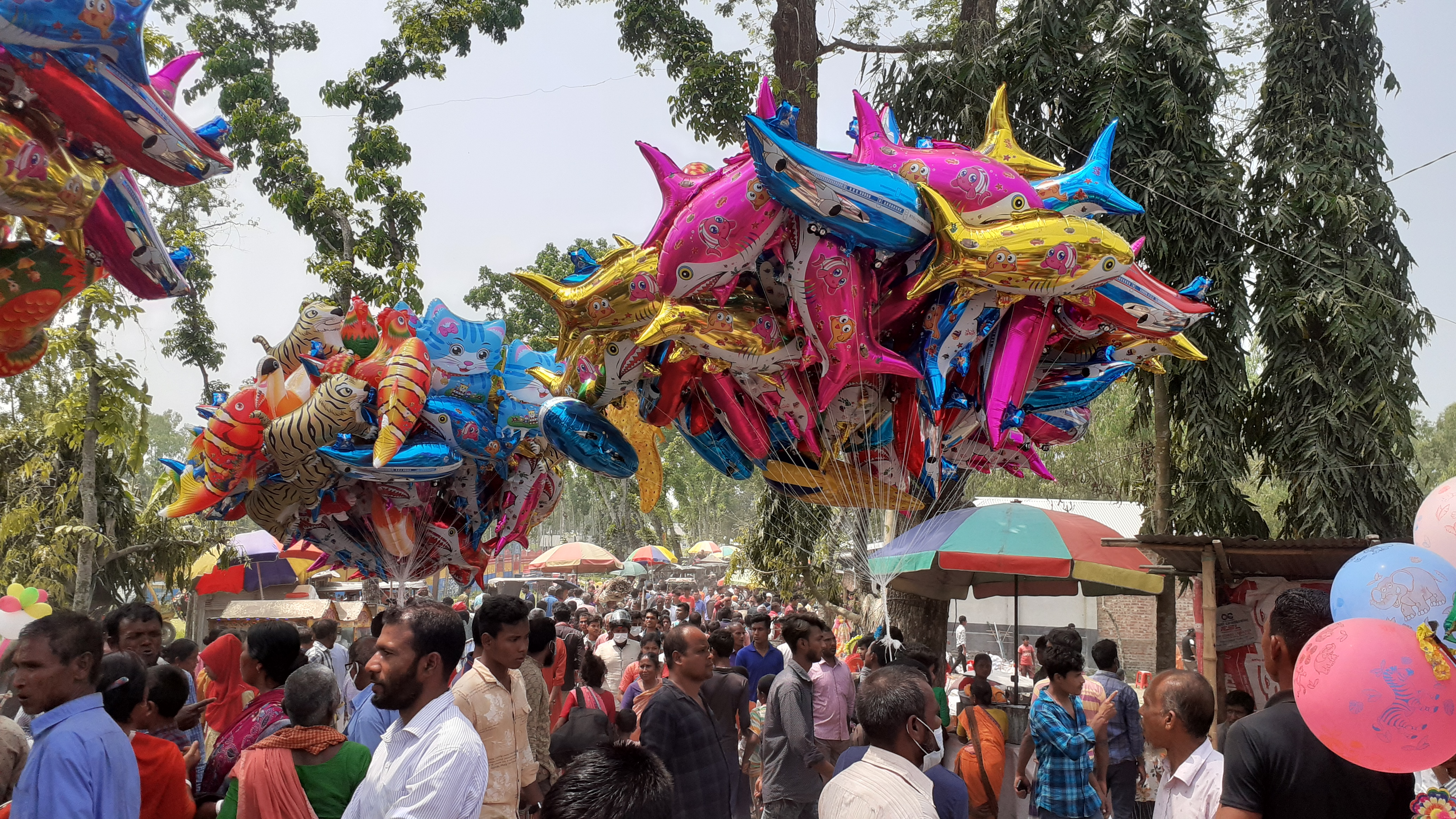
Sindurmoti Mela 2023

Every year on the ninth tithi of Chaitra month, a big fair and other pujas are held in this site. On this occasion, the area becomes resplendent with the arrival of a significant number of Hindu pilgrims from different parts of Bangladesh. Many devotees from the neighboring country of India also attend this fair.

== Others ==
Every year on the last day of the month of Kartik, Punya Deepdan ceremony is held at this ancient and traditional bathing ghat of Sindurmati. Other pujas held here are Krishno Janmashtami, Radhashtami etc. A religious library is also established here at present.

== Gallery ==
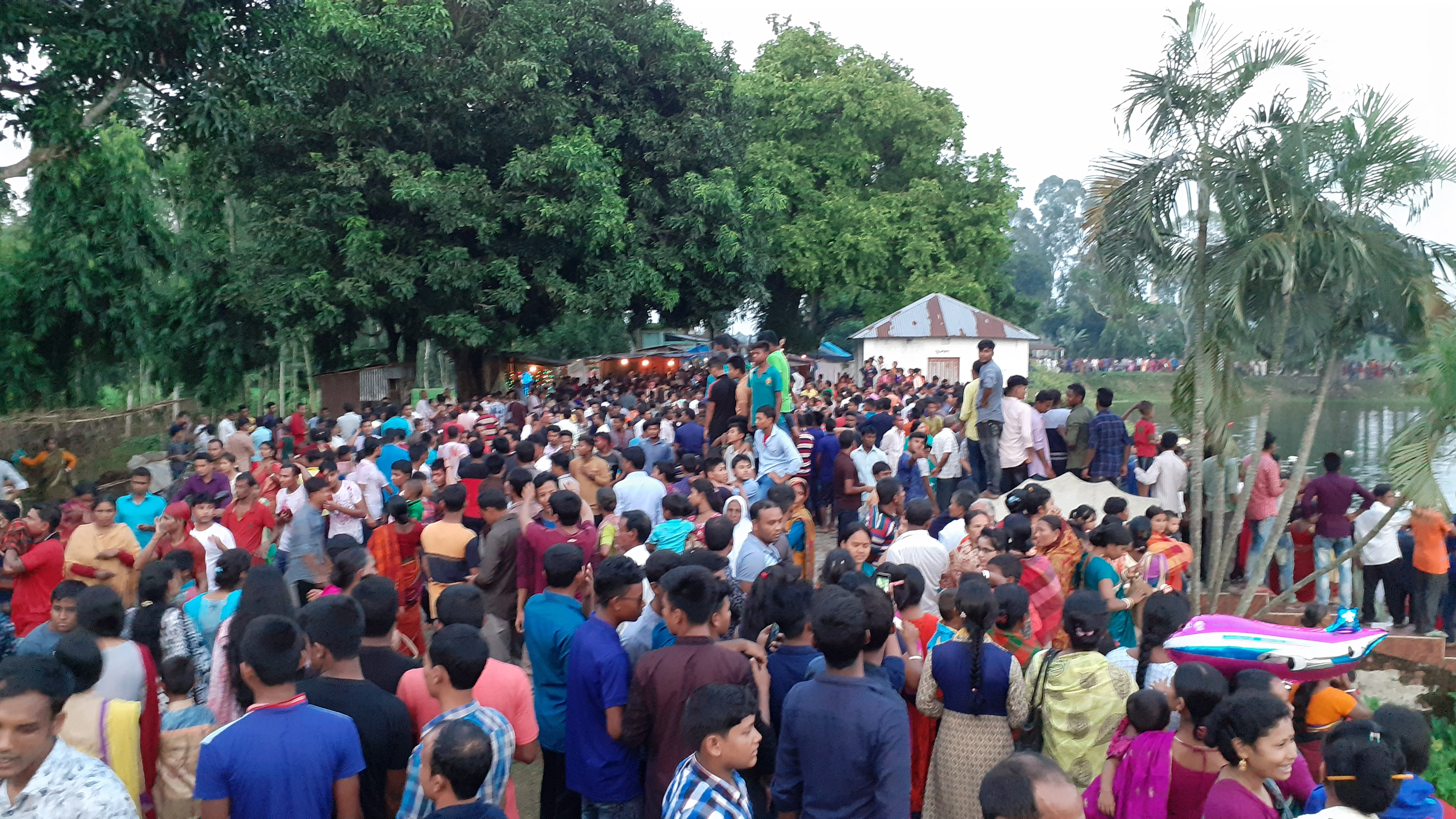
Vijaya Dashami 2019

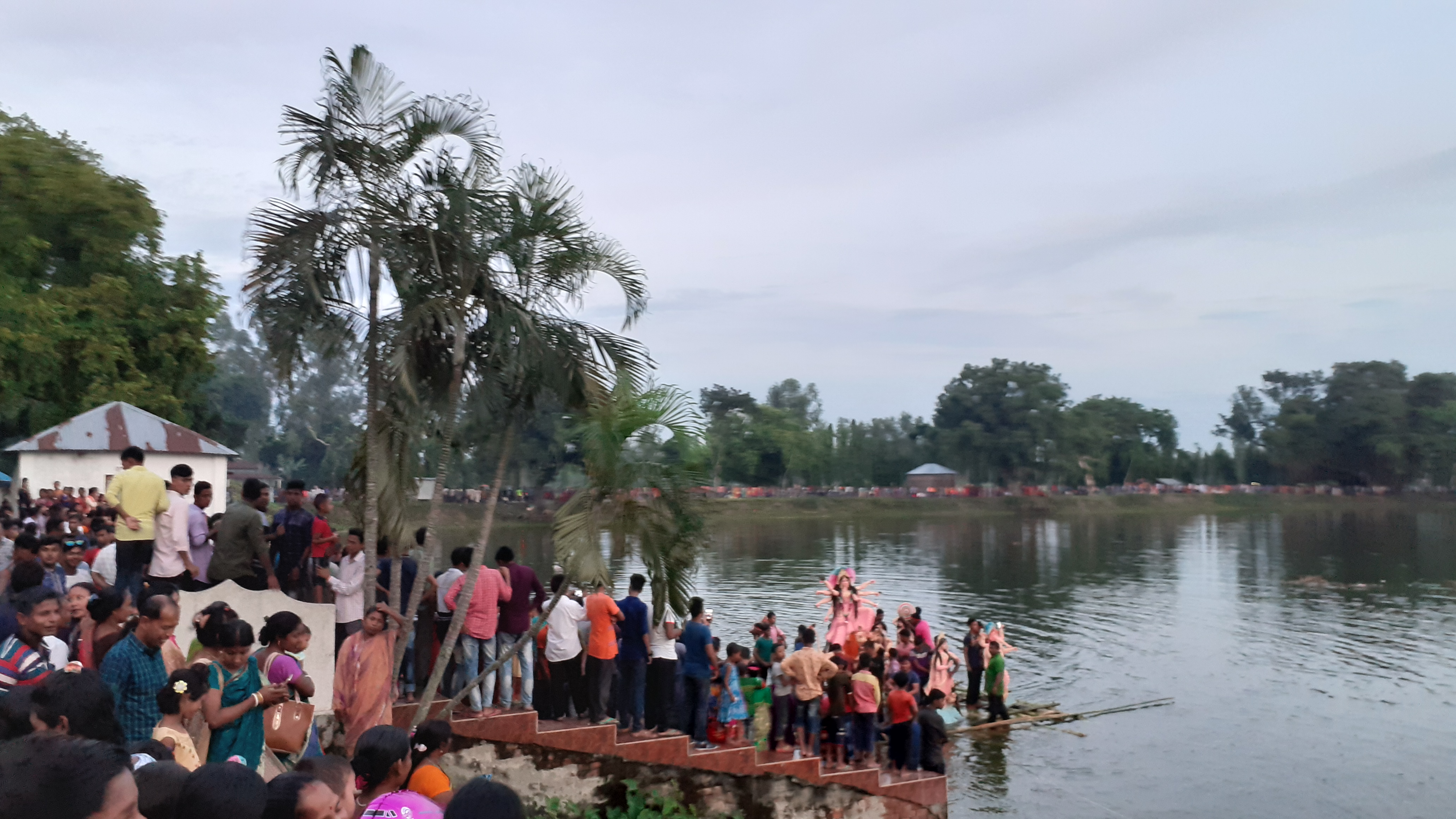
Abandonment of idols in 2019
