= Temple of King Kangsa Narayan =

Hindu temple in Bangladesh

Coordinates: 24.5186°N 88.8448°E

The Temple of King Kangsa Narayan (Bengali: রাজা কংস নারায়ণের মন্দির) is situated in northern Bangladesh. It is in Rajshahi's Tahirpur, where legend states that the Durga Puja of the Hindu community was performed for the first time in the Indian subcontinent.
