= Wahedpur Giri Dham =

Hindu Ashram in Bangladesh

Wahedpur Giri Dham is a Hindu Ashram located in the Debiddhar area in Comilla, Bangladesh. The Ashram was founded by Sri Sangjogananda Giri Mahtma a devout Brahmin Guru in 1933. The Giri Dham held a grand celebration of its 76th anniversary in 2009 drawing thousands of devotees from throughout Bangladesh to attend the religious programs
