= Kal Bhairab Temple, Brahmanbaria =

Hindu temple in Bangladesh

Coordinates: 23.9859280°N 91.1129215°E

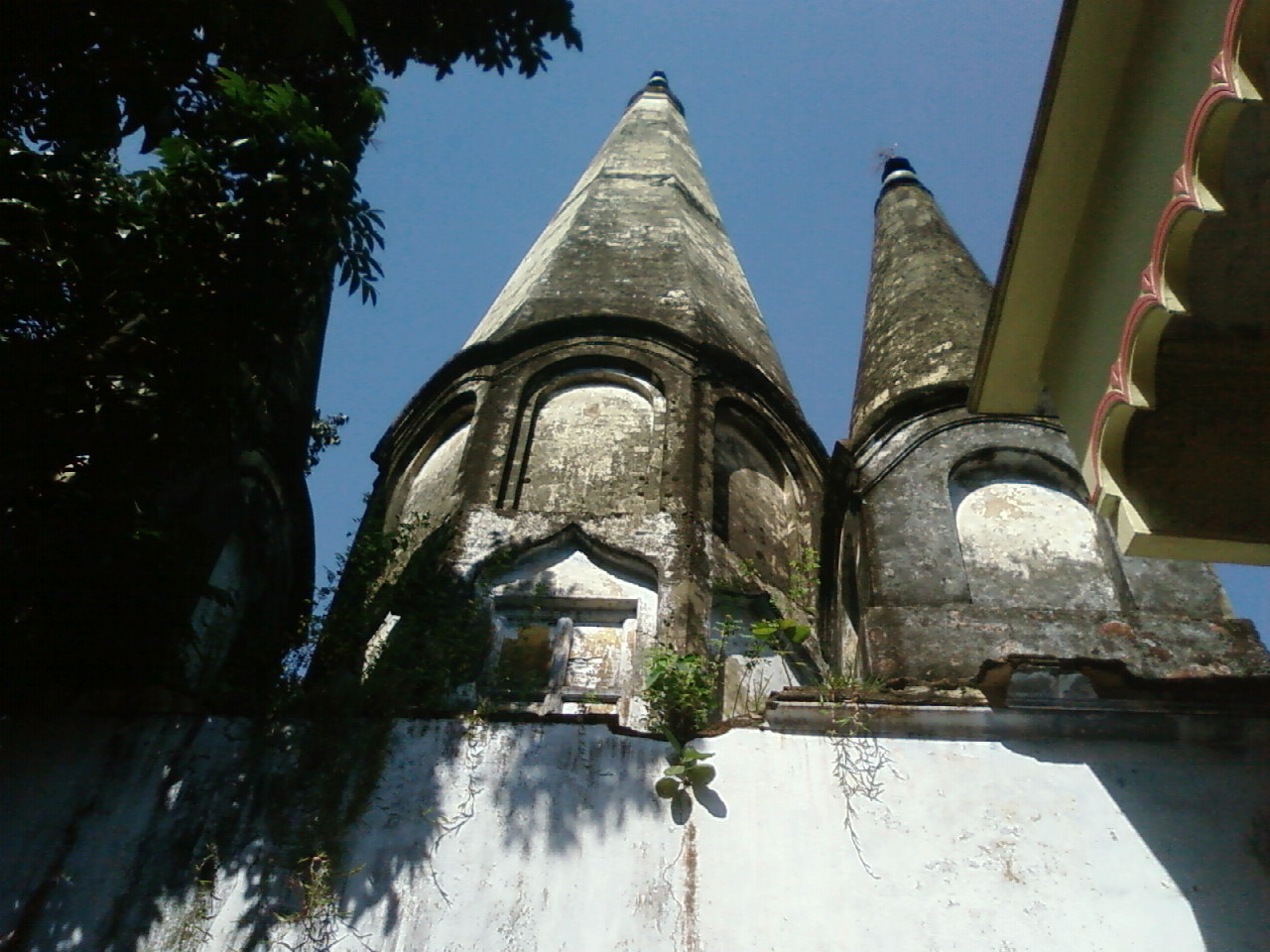
Kal Bhairab Temple

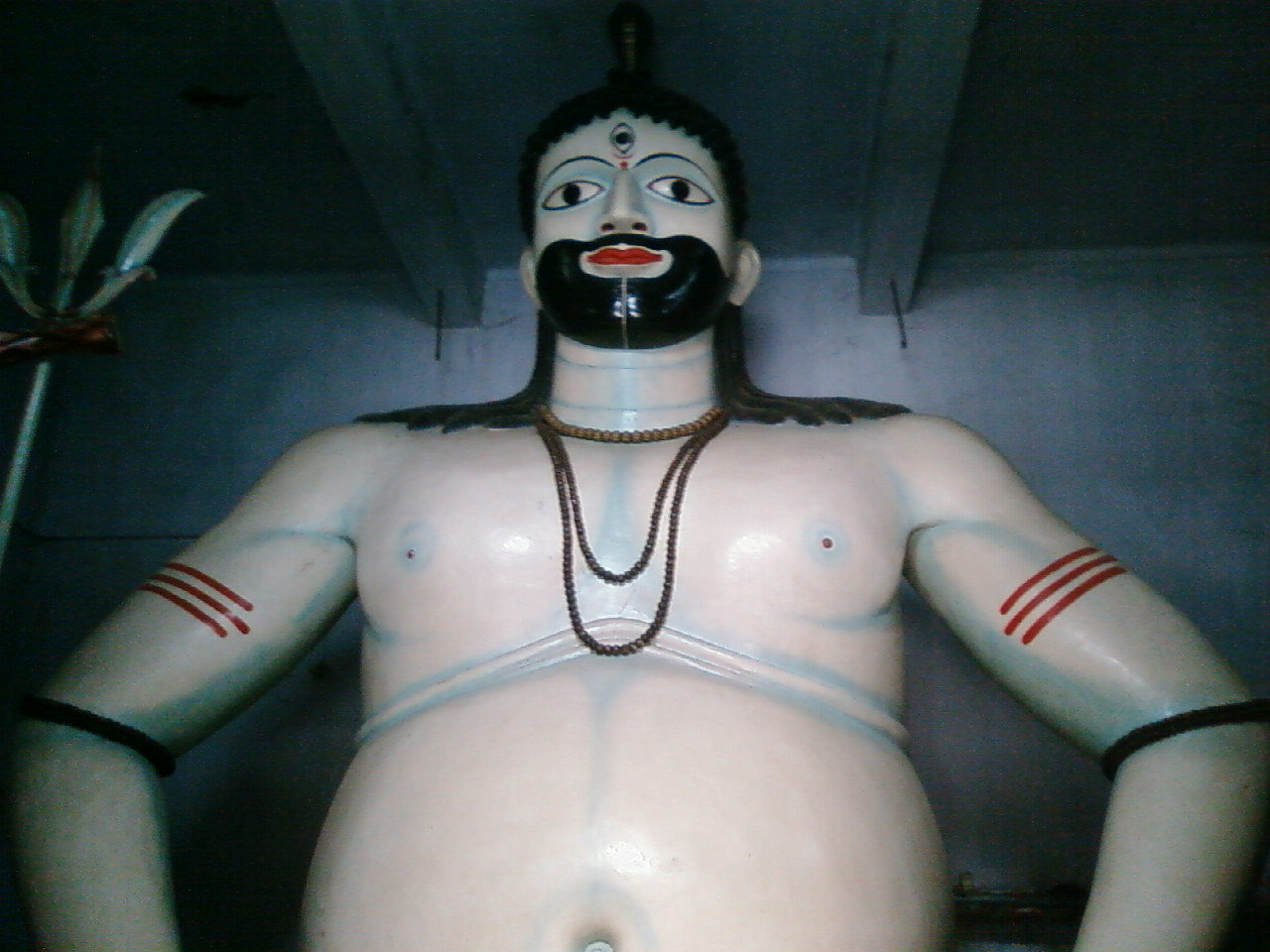
God Kal Bhairab

Kal Bhairab Temple (Bengali: কালভৈরব মন্দির) is a Hindu temple, dedicated to the God Shiva, located in Medda in the Brahmanbaria district of Bangladesh. The temple is famed for the giant Shivalinga, a 28-feet tall Shiva statue assumed to be the largest in the world. Though the Hindu Lord Shiva, who is called the Kal Bhairab is the main attraction, Goddess Kali is also worshipped there. The statue of Kali is situated on the right side of the Kal Bhairab and the statue of the Goddess Parvati is placed on the left. The temple is a major pilgrimage place for Shaivites in Bangladesh.

== History ==
The temple dates back to the 19th century. It is said that approximately 200 years ago a sculptor named Durgacharan Acharjee saw a dream which motivated and influenced him to make preparations to build the statue from soil. Noor Muhammad, the famous landlord of Sarail donated the land to build this temple.

== Location ==
Before the Brahmanbaria city was established, Medda was the market located beside the famous Titas river. This market is almost 300 years old. Durgacharan first built this statue by the bank of the river with soil. Regular prayers were held by the local fans until 1971.

== Damage and restoration ==
During the Bangladesh Liberation War the Pakistani soldiers damaged and looted a lot of Hindu temples in Bangladesh. This temple was one of the damaged temples. The soldiers damaged the parts of this statue using dynamite. Later the statue was made again. It took four years to build this statue again but it reached the height of 24 feet. The current statue is made of stone.

== Prayers and management ==
Both regular and annual prayers are held. People from different regions come to visit this temple. This place is also referred as one of the tourist attractions of the Brahmanbaria district. There are management committees to look after the temple. The giant statue of the Shiva is mostly locked for maintenance issues. The Government of Bangladesh looks after the charges for maintenance.
