= Puthia Upazila =

Puthia Upazila পুঠিয়া উপজেলা
- Upazila of Bangladesh
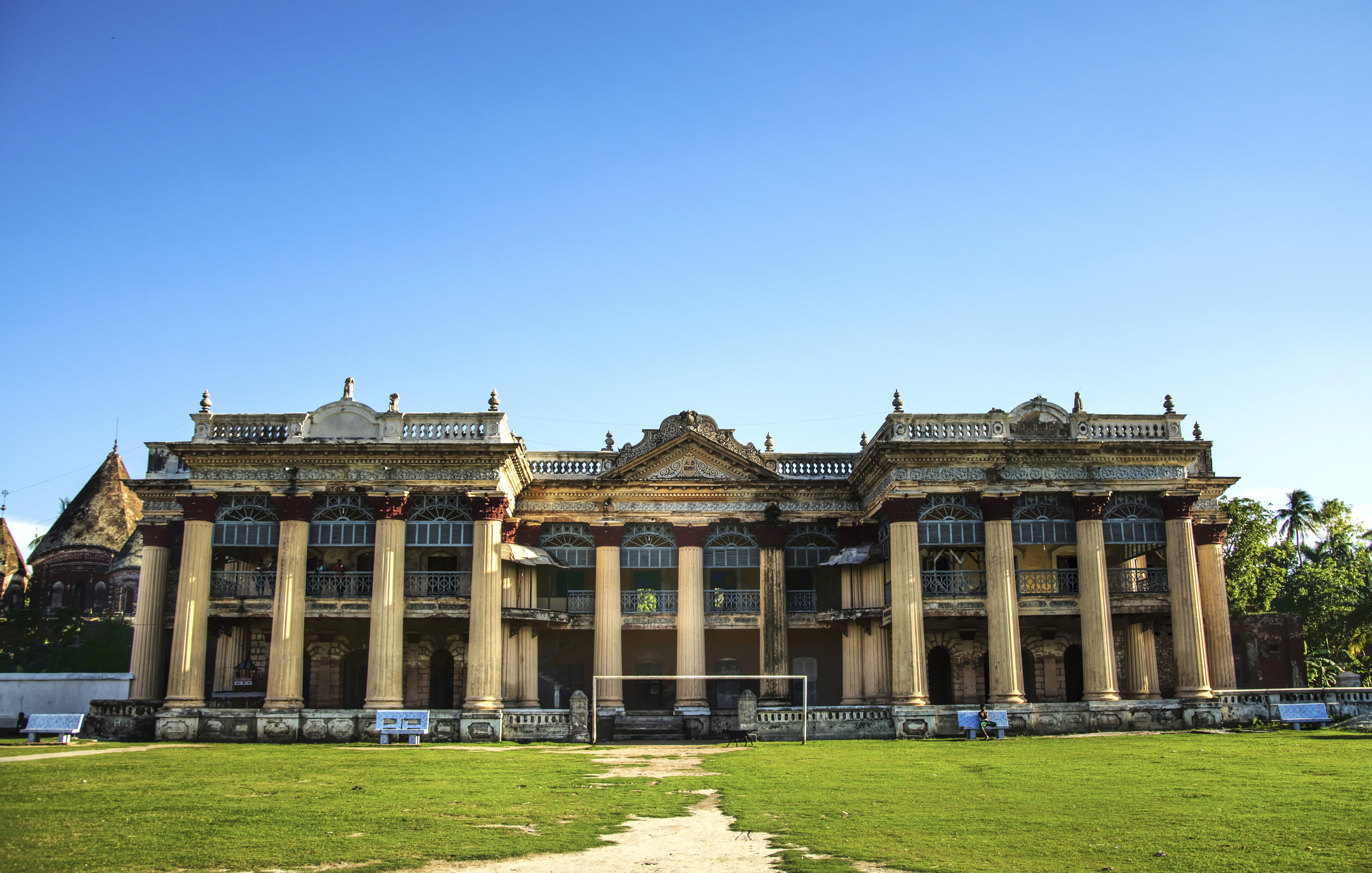
- Puthia Rajbari

- Coordinates: 24°22.5′N 88°51′E
- Country: Bangladesh
- Division: Rajshahi
- District: Rajshahi

Area
  - Total: 192.63 km^{2} (74.37 sq mi)

Population (2022)
  - Total: 224,143
  - Density: 1,163.6/km^{2} (3,013.7/sq mi)
- Time zone: UTC+6 (BST)
- Postal code: 6260
- Area code: 07228
- Website: Official Map of Puthia

Puthia Upazila mauza geocode map

Puthia Upazila (Bengali: পুঠিয়া উপজেলা) is an Upazila of Rajshahi District in the Division of Rajshahi, Bangladesh.

== Geography ==
Puthia is located at 24.3750°N 88.8500°E. It has 52,922 households and total area 192.63 km^{2}. This is a historical & traditional place in Bangladesh for Puthia Rajbari & Shiva Temple Complex.

== Demographics ==
Religions in Puthia Upazila (2022)
Religion	Percent
Islam	94.03%
Hinduism	5.19%
Christianity	0.48%
Other or not stated	0.30%

According to the 2022 Bangladeshi census, Puthia Upazila had 62,484 households and a population of 224,143. 8.02% of the population were under 5 years of age. Puthia had a literacy rate (age 7 and over) of 71.53%: 74.16% for males and 68.93% for females, and a sex ratio of 99.25 males for every 100 females. 37,566 (16.76%) lived in urban areas. Ethnic population was 2,615 (1.17%), of which Santal were 1,320 and Oraon were 910.

According to the 2011 Census of Bangladesh, Puthia Upazila had 52,922 households and a population of 207,490. 37,278 (17.97%) were under 10 years of age. Puthia had a literacy rate (age 7 and over) of 49.58%, compared to the national average of 51.8%, and a sex ratio of 975 females per 1000 males. 25,761 (12.42%) lived in urban areas. Ethnic population was 1,698 (0.82%).

As of the 1991 Bangladesh census, Puthia has a population of 342,405. Males constitute 51.16% of the population, and females 48.84%. This Upazila's eighteen up population is 81679. Puthia has an average literacy rate of 25.5% (7+ years), and the national average of 32.4% literate.

== Administration ==
Puthia Upazila is divided into Puthia Municipality and six union parishads: Baneshwar, Belpukuria, Bhalukgachhi, Jeopara, Puthia, and Silmaria. The union parishads are subdivided into 128 mauzas and 183 villages.

== Education ==
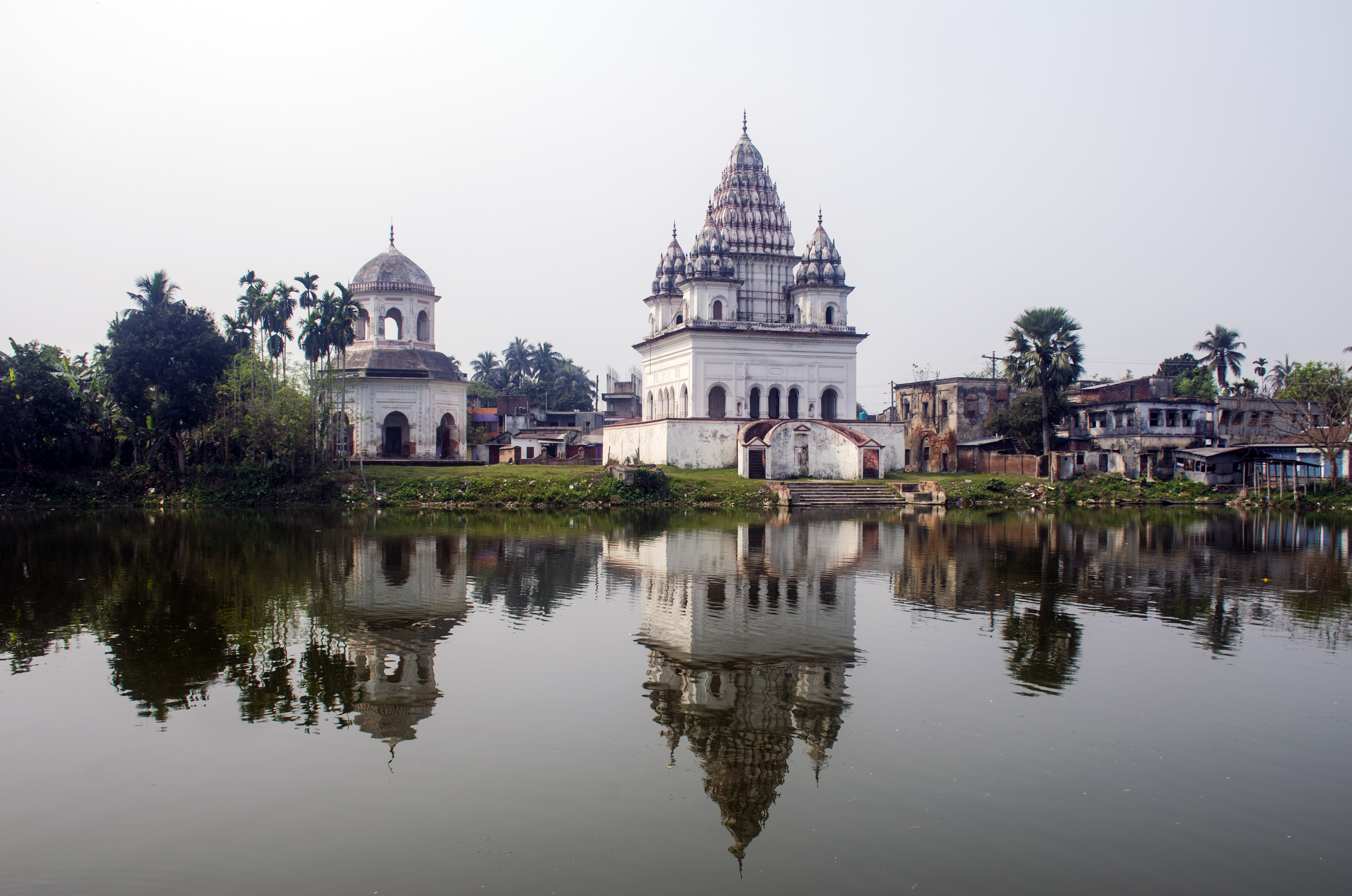
Rath Mandir and Boro Shiv Mandir of Puthia with reflection on Shiv Sagar

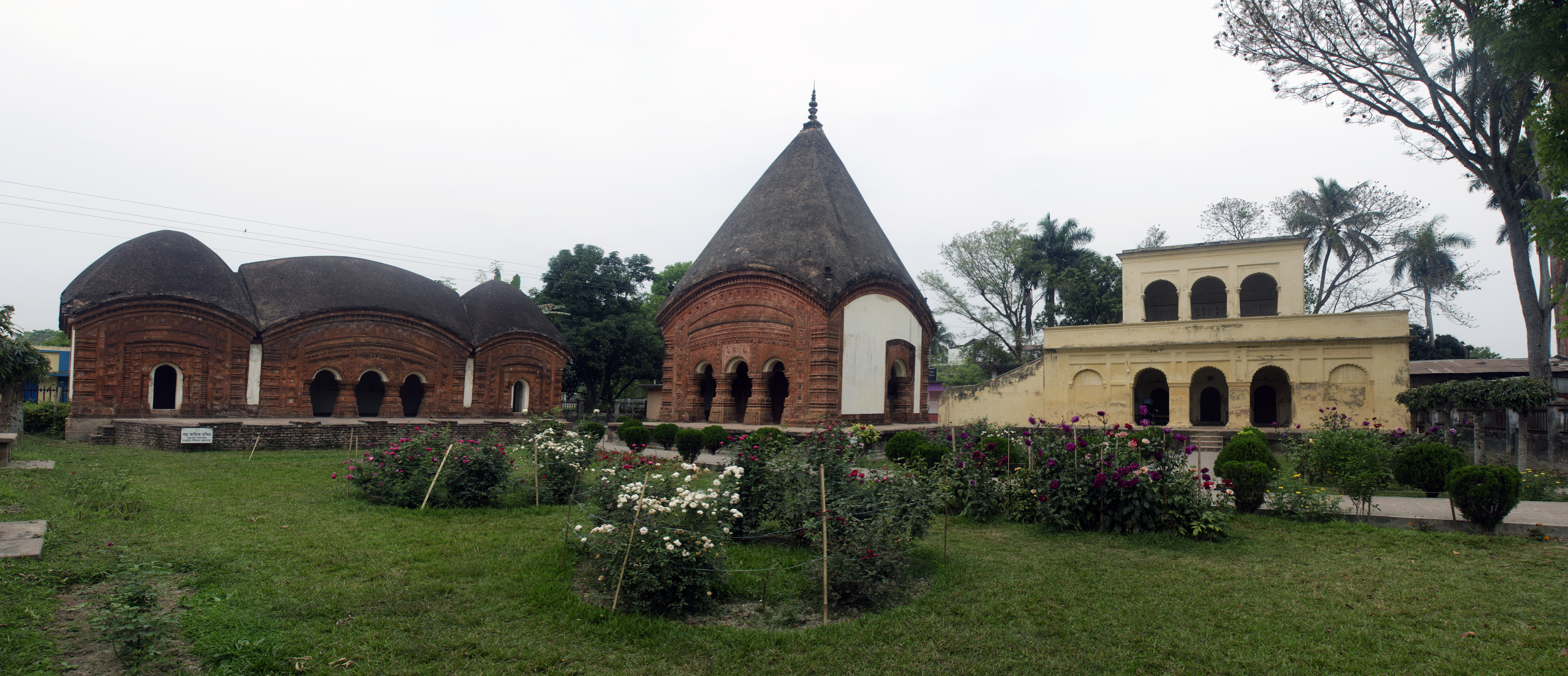
Left to right: Boro Annik Mandir, Choto Gobindo Mandir and Gopal Mandir

There are 12 colleges in the upazila. They include Dhokrakul Degree College, Dhopapara Memorial Degree College, Ideal Degree College, Laskherpur Degree Mahavidya Niketan, Pangu Shishu Niketon S A Degree College, Pochamaria Degree College, Puthia Islamia Mohila College, and Puthia Mohila Degree College. Baneshwar College, founded in 1964, is the only honors level one.

According to Banglapedia, Dhokrakul High School, founded in 1949, and PN Technical High School (1865), are notable secondary schools.

== See also ==
- Upazilas of Bangladesh
- Districts of Bangladesh
- Divisions of Bangladesh
- Puthia Temple Complex
- Puthia Rajbari (palace)
- Pancha Ratna Govinda Temple
