= Buckland Bund =

Building in Dhaka, Bangladesh

Coordinates: 23°41′13.1″N 90°23′49.1″E

Buckland Bund (Bengali: বাকল্যান্ড বাঁধ) is a historically significant architectural creation situated by the Buriganga river bank of Old Dhaka, Bangladesh. It was constructed by Charles Thomas Buckland in 1864 who was the commissioner of Dhaka during that period.

== History ==
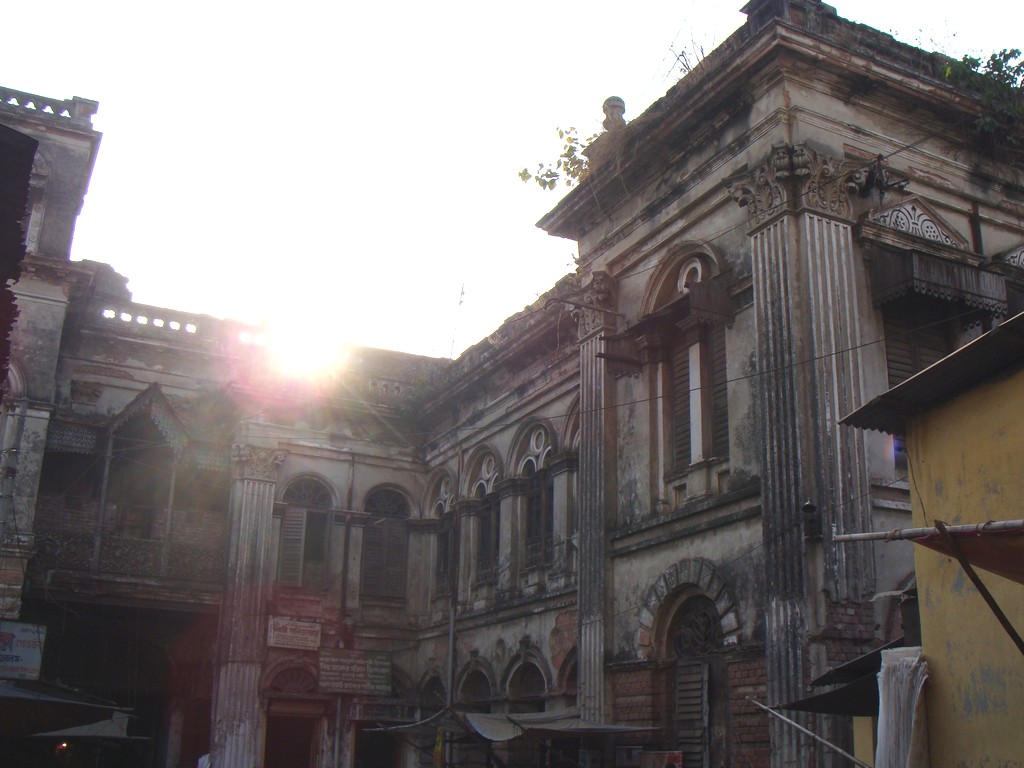
Farashganj

Charles Thomas Buckland was appointed the commissioner of Dhaka 1864 and he had a very successful tenure at this post for 5 years. Azimush-Shan built a palace for himself in Posht on the bank of Buriganga which was situated about 400 yards away from Lalbagh Fort. The palace is now washed up by the river, but the embankment was visible for a long time. This embankment goes right eastward and terminates at Babubazar Khal. It is clearly visible when passing by boats. According to Rennel, this bund in 1765 extended four miles northeast to southwest. Even though there was already a bund by the Buriganga river bank from the Mughal period, it was Buckland who took the initiative to build a metaled road over it. That is how the road by the riverbank came to be known as the Buckland Bund which is almost one mile long, from Farashganj (French Town) to Babu Bazaar.

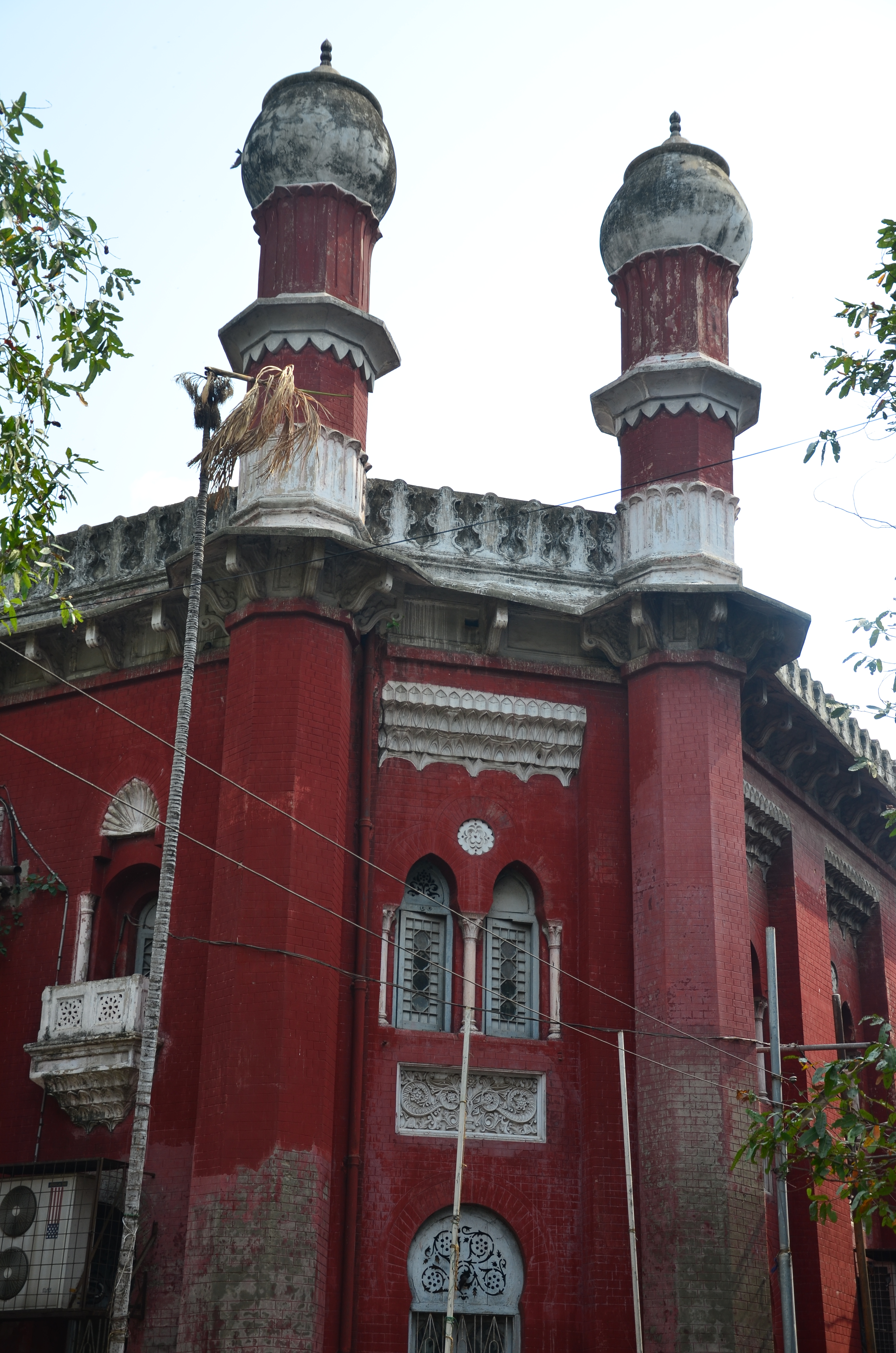
Northbrok Hall, Dhaka 09

Initially Buckland collected the funds to build the bund from Dhaka's well established and rich people amongst whom were Khwaja Abdul Ghani, the zamindar of Bhawal Kali Narayan Rai, Jagannath Rai Chowdhury and Mohinimohon Dash. In Nazir Hossain's Book Kingbodontir Dhakai he mentioned Bhutto Hazi as well as one of the financial contributors. Buckland started the construction work with the collection of tk.65,000 but unfortunately he could not finish the work during his reign of 5 years as the commissioner as he had to leave Dhaka and as believe by many, it was probably Simson the next commissioner finished the work of Buckland Bund. It is said that the fund collected by Mr. Buckland was not enough to finish the construction work, hence his successor Simson arranged more tk.10,000 from the local fund and borrowed tk.8,000 from Khwaja Abdul Gani Miyah to continue the work even though there was still a little financial shortage. Seeing this, Khwaja Abdul Ghani donated Tk.2,000 more to help the cause and tk.2,000 more was collected as tax from Mohini Mohon Dash to arrange the rest of the fund. A few more information was collected from the autobiography of Hridoynath Mojumder. According to him, during the first year of construction the road was built from Northbrook Hall to Owaiz Ghat and in the next year it was built from Ruplal House to Badamtoli Ghat. The east side was completed with the donation of Ruplal Dash and the west side was completed with the donation of Nawab Abdul Gani whereas the middle part was built with the donation of the government.

== Architectural significance ==
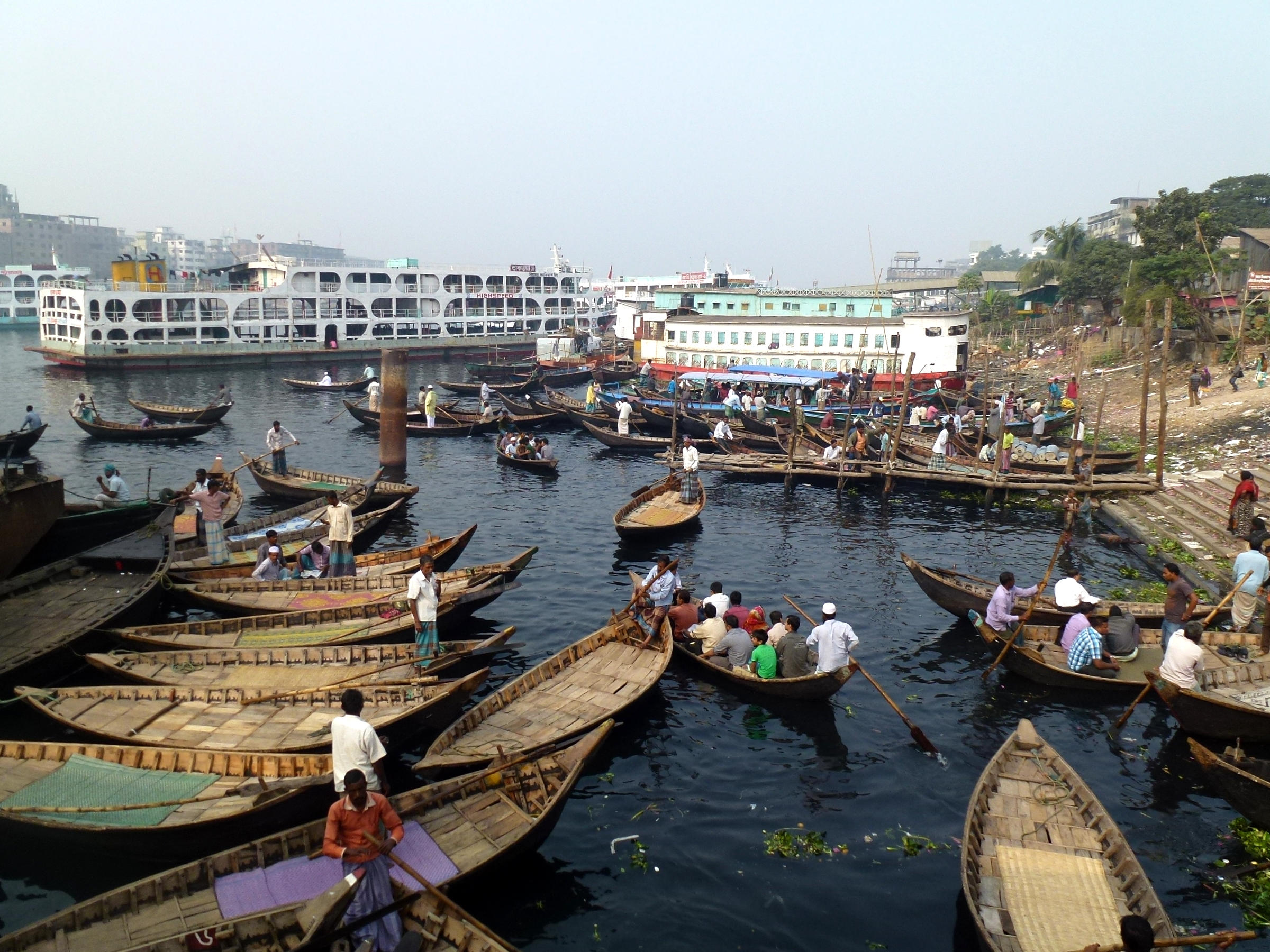
Sadarghat Old Dhaka Bangladesh - panoramio

Buckland Bund was a place for recreation and passing time for local people not only in the 19th century but also in the beginning decades of the 20th century. It was a very attractive place to visit for the middle class local people of that time. During C. T. Buckland's period, under government initiative a lot of buildings and significant architectural creations took place in Dhaka. In fact, during the time of his leaving he was offered an “Appreciation Certificate” from the communities of Muslims, Hindus, Armenians and English which unfortunately he could not accept due to not having such permission from the government. Buckland Bund was a new gathering place for the people of Dhaka as the view of the river was an amazing piece of recreation for them. According to the autobiography of Ridoai Nath Mojhumder, 12 steel benches were provided there at first which were not sufficient so 8 more benches were added. The crowd visiting the Buckland Bund at that time proved that it was a very refreshing place and even today after almost 300 years the place is still used as a social gathering place by the local people. The construction of the bund quickly transformed the area into a very posh place and a lot of zamindars started to erect their mansions on and around this bund.

== Present condition ==
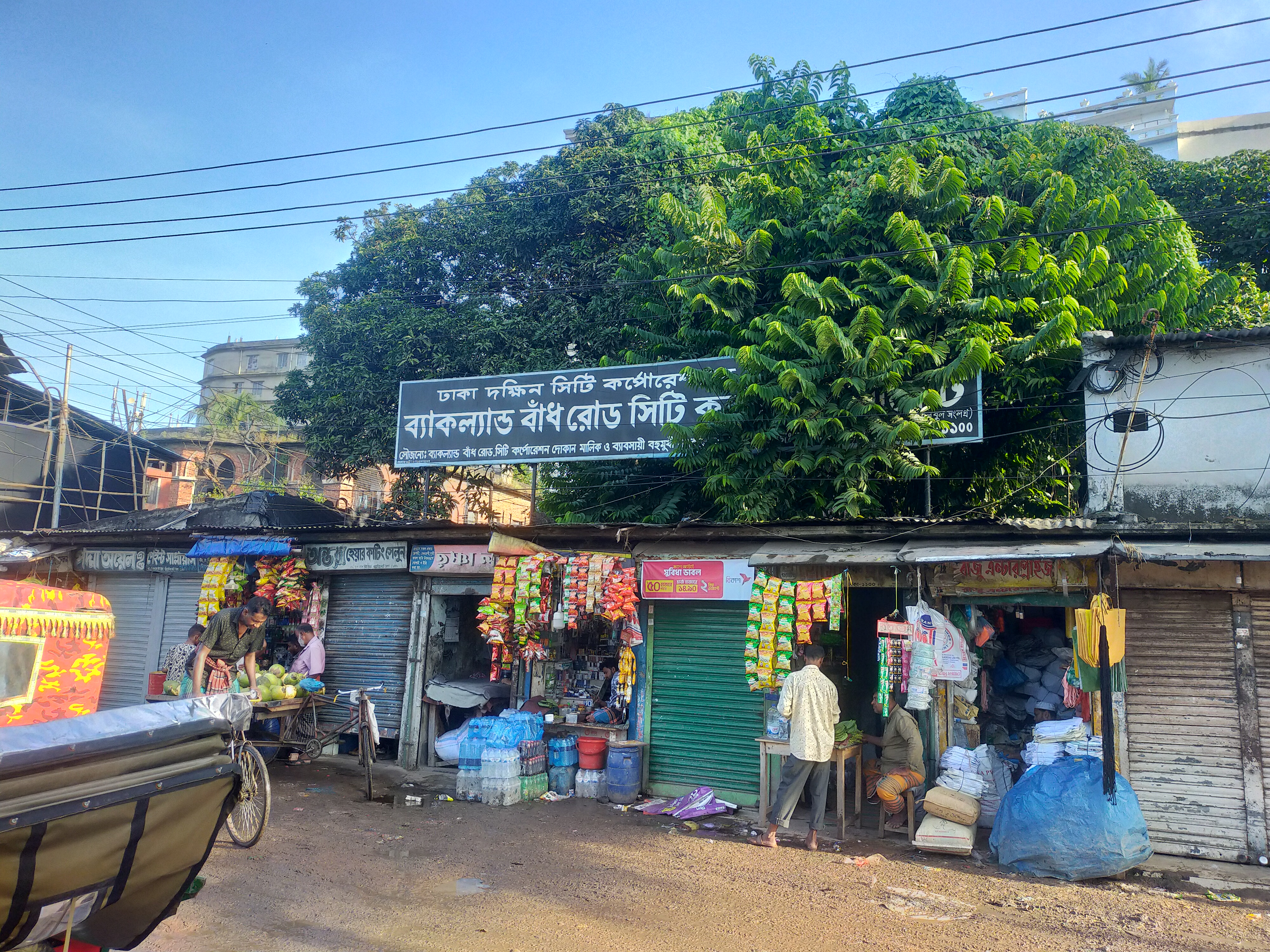
Current condition of Buckland Bund, occupied by fruits and other shops and rickshaws (October 2025)

Buckland Bund was a very elegant riverfront of Dhaka in the early 1900s but has since deteriorated. Academic Partha Chatterjee describes it, in 2002, as "one of the most congested streets of the city. As one trudges through the slush and garbage, negotiating the fruit and vegetable vendors and endless stream of rickshaws, one's view of the river blocked off by an ugly wall and with no trees in sight, it is hard to imagine that the road had been built as an attractive riverfront boulevard." During the reign of Ayub Khan, the rights of the bund was transferred to the government from the public in 1963, the bund's maintenance and beauty started to deteriorate.
