= Farashganj =

Human settlement in Bangladesh

Farashganj ফরাসগঞ্জ (Bengali) Farasgange (French)
- Neighbourhood
- Farashganj
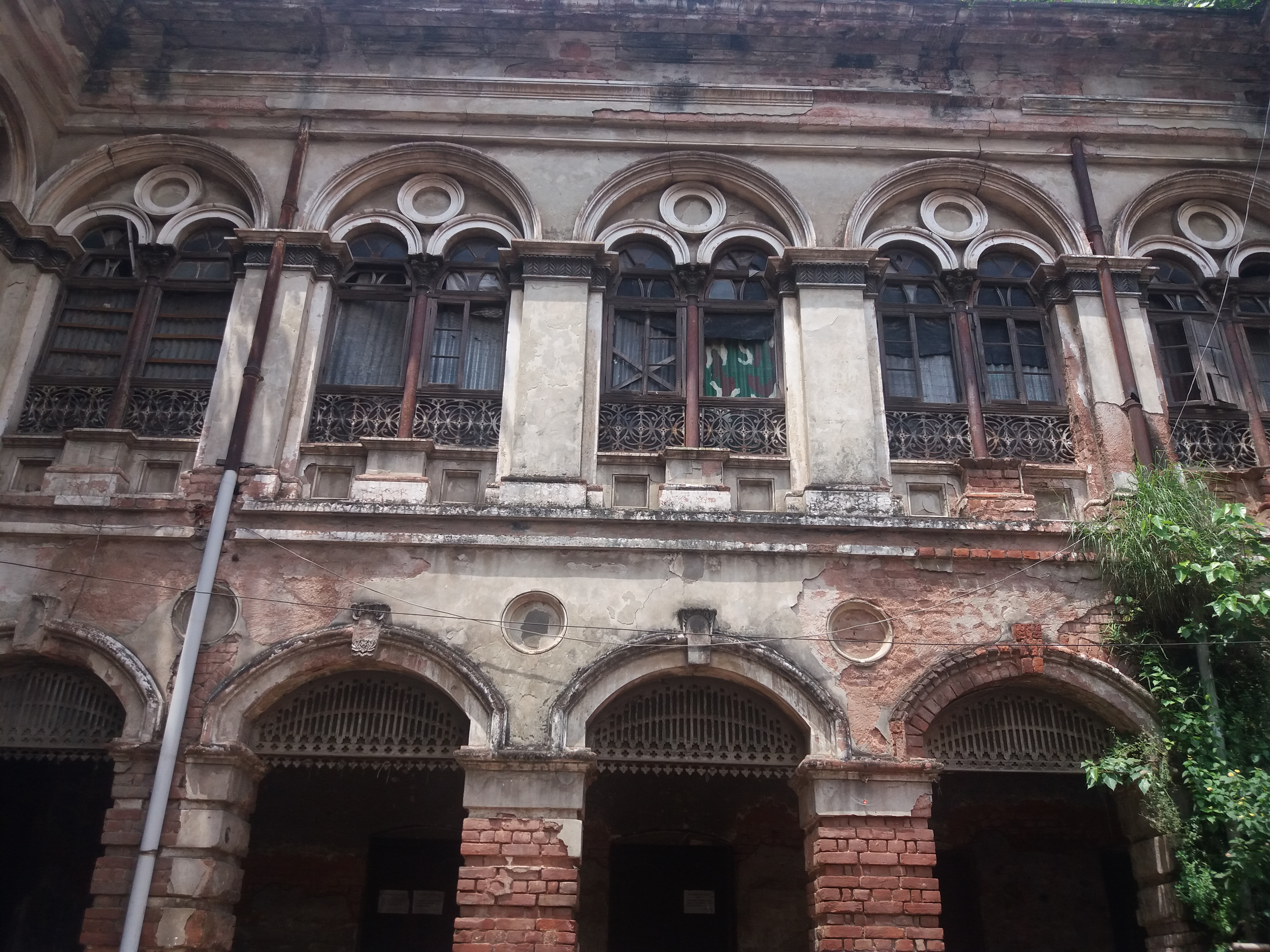
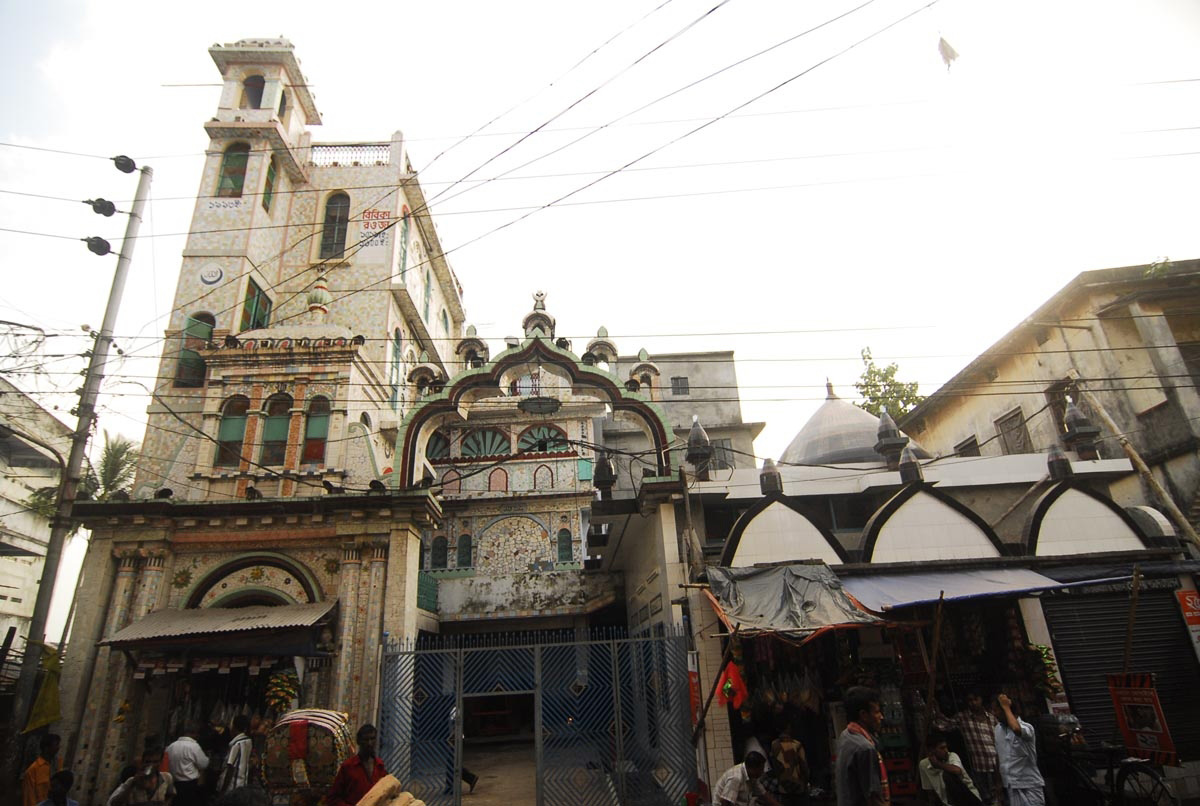
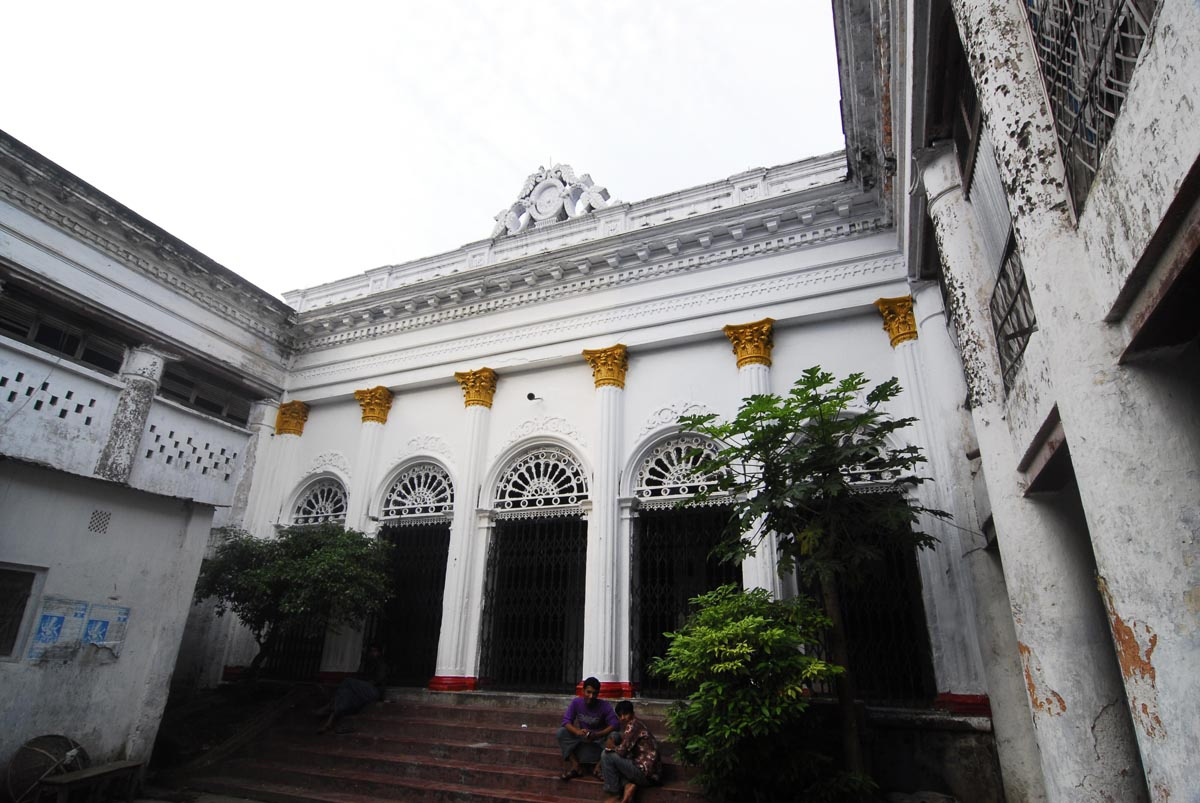
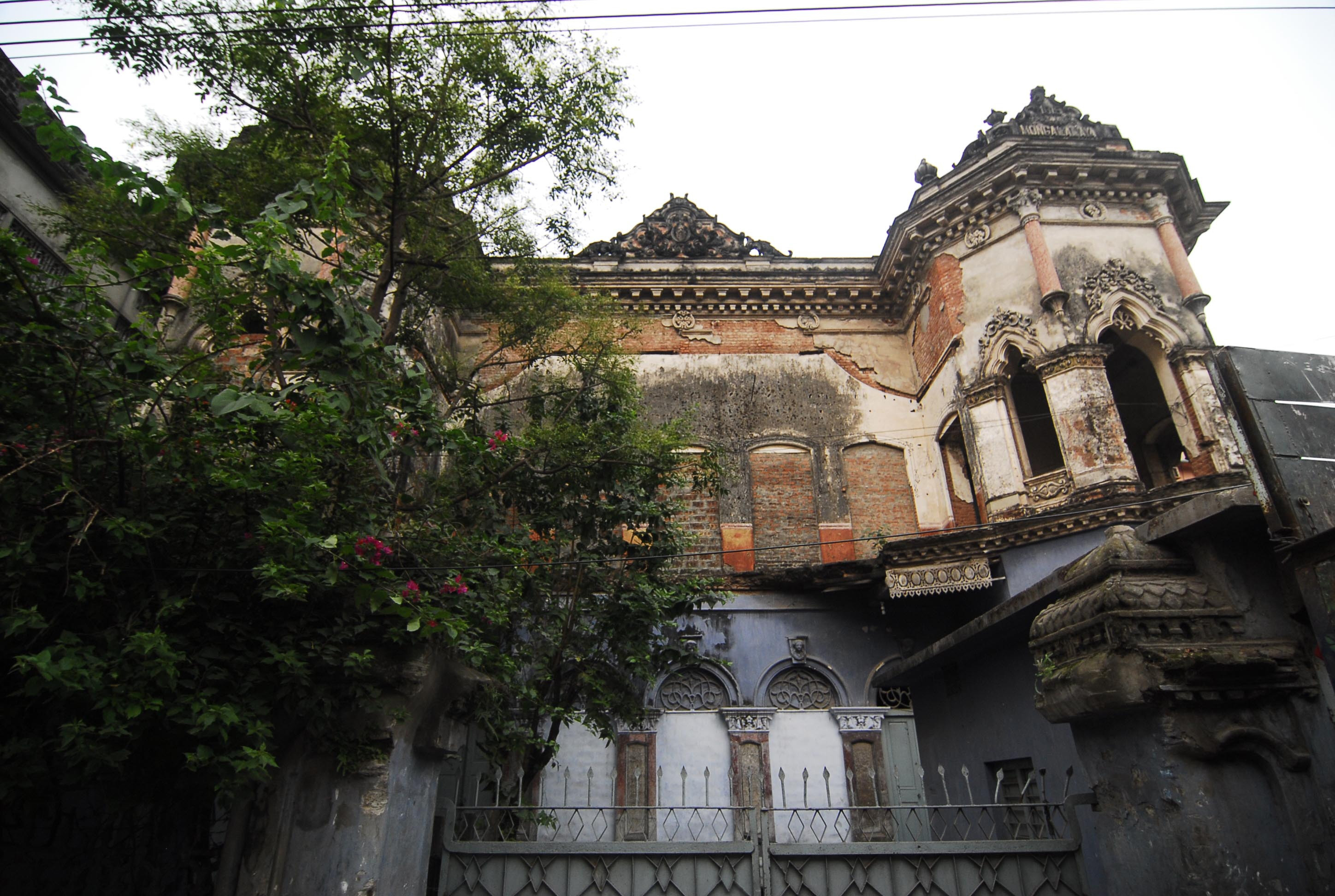
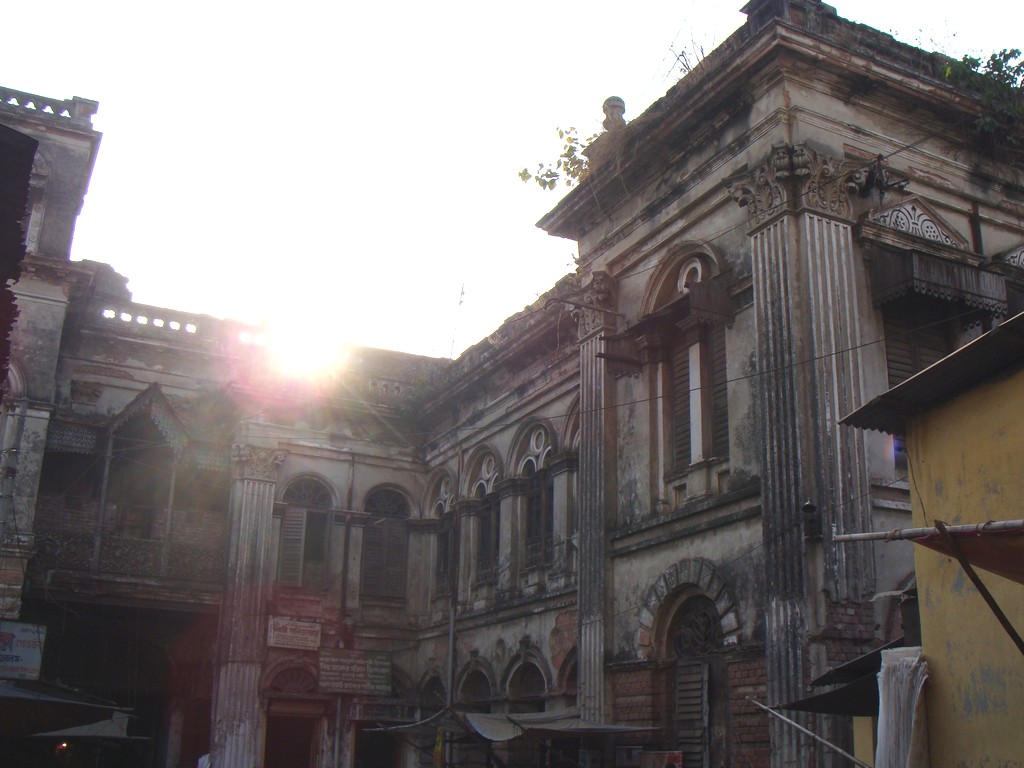
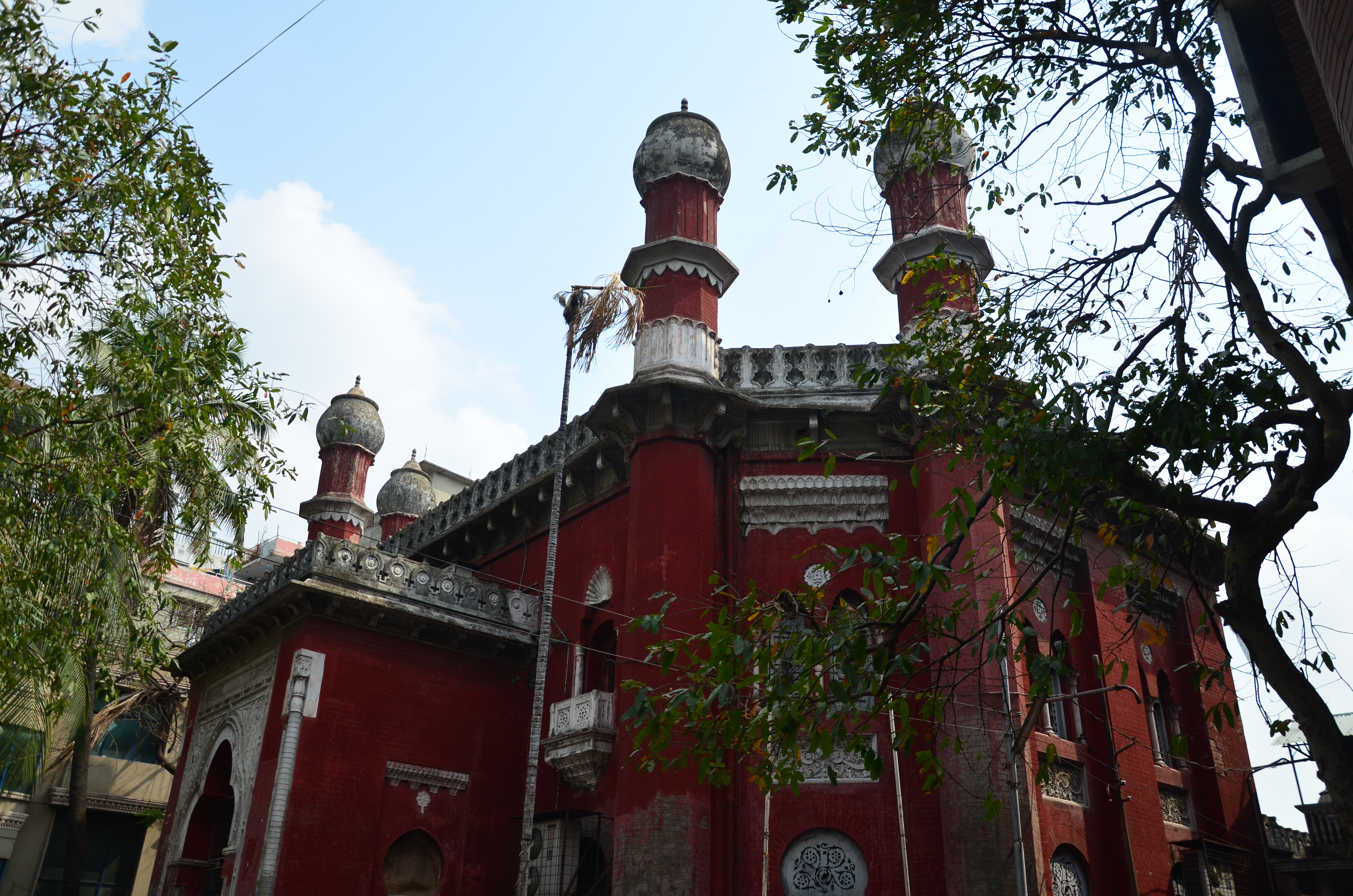
- Clockwise from the top: Ruplal House, Shree Shree Priya Ballabh, Buckland Bund, Northbrook Hall, Mangalalay, Bibi Ka Rauza
- Etymology: Farash (French) + ganj (town)
- Nicknames: Frenchganj; French town
- Interactive map of Farashganj
- Location of Farashganj within Dhaka Farashganj (Bangladesh)
- Coordinates: 23°42′08″N 90°25′07″E
- Country: Bangladesh
- Division: Dhaka
- District: Dhaka District
- City Corporation: Dhaka South City Corporation
- Thana: Sutrapur
- Ward: 43
- Established: 1740
- Founded by: French East India Company
- Demonyms: Farasgangeois (m); Farasgangeoise (f)

Languages
  - Official: Bengali
  - Historical: French
- Time zone: UTC+6 (BST)
- Postal code: 1100

Farashganj (Bengali: ফরাশগঞ্জ [pʰɔɾaʃɡɔnd͡ʒ], French: Farasgange [faʁasɡɑ̃ʒ]) is a neighborhood in Dhaka, Bangladesh. The name comes from the Bengali word for French which is Forashi and ganj, meaning market-town.

== History ==
Farashganj literally means French town, it takes its name from French merchants based in Dhaka city. In 1740 the French East India Company started operations in Dhaka and built their "Kuthi" near Ahsan Manzil Palace with permission from Nowazish Mohammad Khan. The French got into minor conflicts with the British over a factory but was resolved through the mediation of Naib Nazim Jasarat Khan. The French merchants established wholesale trading posts for spices like raw turmeric, ginger, garlic and chilli. They built fine residences such as the Ruplal House.

In the late nineteenth century, an influx of lumber-yards and wooden furniture manufacturers made the neighborhood, "the new furniture centre of Dacca".

== Geography ==
Farashganj is located on the northern bank of the Buriganga River in Old Dhaka. Its principal thoroughfares are B. K. Das Road and Ahsanullah Road.

== Points of interest ==
There are a number of historic buildings in Farashganj, mostly dilapidated. The stately two-story riverside mansion Ruplal House is now occupied by squatters. The once magnificent 19th-century mansion Bara Bari, with its ornate curved balconies over the street, has been partly demolished.

Loharpul bridge also located in Farashganj. It was a great engineering feat at that time. In 1832 the collector of Dhaka, Mr. Walter put up work for a single-span hanging bridge over the canal at Sutrapur (Farashganj) for facilitating passage from Dhaka to Narayanganj.

Farashganj Sporting Club, established in 1959, is situated between the historical sites Ruplal House and Northbrook Hall.
