= Ruplal House =

- Aratoon House
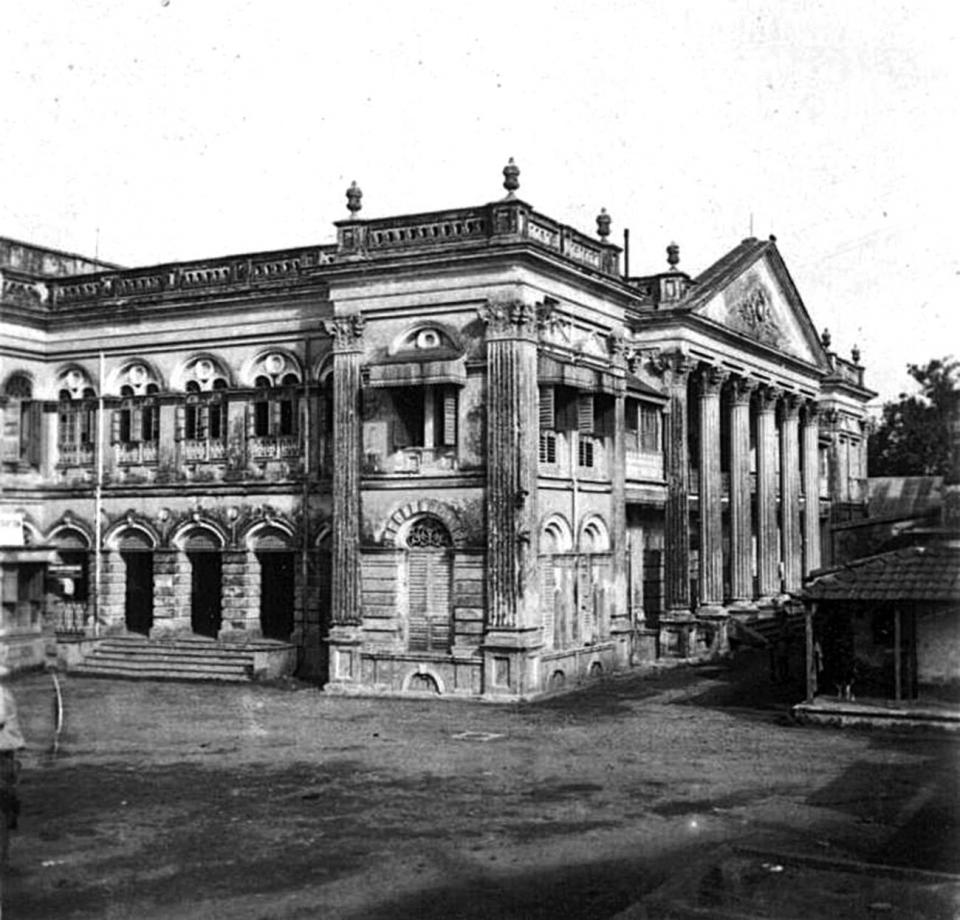
- Ruplal House in early 1900s
- Interactive map of Ruplal House
- 23°42′13.1″N 90°24′49.1″E
- Location: Farashganj, Dhaka, Bangladesh

History
- Built: 1825

Site notes
- Architectural style: Renaissance architecture
- List of Old Dhaka Heritage Sites

Ruplal House (formerly known as Aratoon House) is a 19th-century mansion in Farashganj area in Dhaka, Bangladesh. It was built on the northern bank of the Buriganga River, beside the Buckland Dam. The house was built in 1825 by an Armenian businessman Stephen Aratoon. It was later bought by two merchants, Ruplal Das and his brother Raghunath Das, in 1840. Later, an architect firm of Calcutta, Martin Company, re-constructed this building.

== History ==
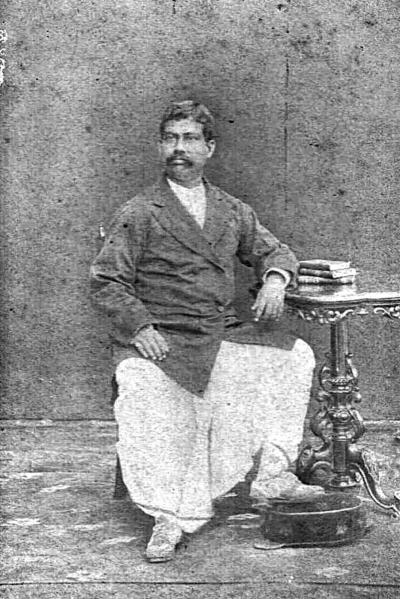
Ruplal Das, after whom the mansion is named.

Ruplal House first came into limelight in 1886 when Ruplal Das threw a ball dance party in the honor of the Viceroy of India Lord Dufferin. After the partition of India in 1947, the family of Ruplal Das left for Kolkata. In 1962, through a formal deed of exchange, Siddick Jamall bought the house.

== Features ==
Divided into two unequal blocks in slightly different styles, it is a two-storeyed edifice. It presents a Grand River front, about 9144 m long. It replicated Greek Doric columns and there used to be a huge clock at the top of the building. In the earthquake of 1897. Its ground plan follows the shape of the letter 'E', with three arms extending towards the north or the city side, of which the middle arm projects about 1830 m. It accommodates a grand portico carried on a series of lofty semi-Corinthian fluted columns, and surmounted by a triangular pediment, characteristic of the Renaissance architecture.

The two blocks include, in two floors, over fifty rooms of various sizes and of them the central hall on the upper floor, of the more impressive western wing, was an elegantly decorated ballroom with a wooden floor. On the north and south two broad verandas run the entire length of the block and are supported on either round semi-Corinthian columns or rectangular brick pillars with segmented or trefoil arches above. The Ruplal House was the only competitor to the Ahsan Manzil during the British colonial era.

== Architectural style and structural features ==
Ruplal house has three distinct blocks of different architectural style; these blocks were separated in the ground floor, but related at the upper floor by arch way. Those three blocks were:

1. Ruplal block [western wing- around twenty five thousand square ft.]
2. Raghunath block [eastern wing- around twelve thousand square ft.]
3. Central block [approximately nine thousand square ft.]

Architectural Features: Ruplal Block Ruplal block was designed in the Neo-classical style. This grand wing was square in plan with a square central courtyard. The lighter plain columns give the court sense of light and proportions. The rooms were arranged around this central courtyard in order to give privacy. Its main entry is from the northern portico with a triangular pediment over fluted columns with Corinthian capitals, which emphasizes the entry and its secondary entry from the front court through the series of archways which is also inviting. Service block lowering height is slightly detached from the main block.

Structural Features: Ruplal Block Foundation: load bearing brick masonry foundation is used as the superstructure without using any reinforcement. There is no crack or sag seen in the foundation. Plinth is 2’ high from the ground level.

Walls: Load bearing 25” thick. Brick masonry is layered in walls. Lime concrete is used as the mortar and plastering materials. Columns: Three types of columns; Neo-Corinthian, circular, squares columns. Arch: Serve as lintels made of bricks over the doors, windows, and also on the circulation passages. Beams: Steel I beam. For wide span double steel beams are used. Steel I beam of Size- 3”x6”, 4”x8” and 6”x12. Wooden beams: Size 3”x3” Floor: 11” thick layered floor of Red oxide, Brick masonry Tiles, Lime Concrete. Staircase: Wooden staircases. One stair is partly reinforced. Wooden stairs are used with iron joists. Material: Bricks are used as the main building material. They are varied in size and shape. Brick tiles are used in the cornice. Plaster: Lime concrete. No blister is seen in the walls and columns because of using glue. Finish materials: Marble tiles, Terrazzo, Red oxide, colored tinted glass.

Architectural Features: Raghunath Block This block has different architectural style which lies in the eastern part of the complex. There are no arches in the façade which faces the entrance court in the north. The capitals are no longer Corinthian, but seem to be more Indian origin. These columns are mostly circular brick columns with plain square capitals. Workmanship of this block is in fact much ordinary to that in Ruplal's Block. This block also consists of two rectangular courtyards. The rooms are rather elongated.

Zoning and Hierarchy of spaces: An attempt of zoning is noticeable. Service areas are grouped together and located at the rear side of the building and stairs are at corners. A gradual sequences of spaces unfolds as we go up to the stairs on the transitional space- the veranda, across the living room to the bedrooms and beyond that the open interior court and then to the service blocks.

Lighting and ventilation: The two interior open courts act as light wells and allow enough light and air to the rooms of both floors. Each room has a considerable number of doors and windows.

Structural features: Raghunath Block 22” Load bearing brick masonry as Ruplal Block. Brick and lime mortar are used here. Walls are finished with lime plaster and paint.

Floors were constructed with burnt clay tiles covered with lime concrete finished and red oxide.

Ceiling supported on wooden beams which run along the length at one tile length apart. This frame is fixed in the walls with steel plates. Absence of steel I beam. The roof has a layer of lime terracing.

Brick arches are used.

Architectural Features: Central block This block has similarity with Ruplal Block but in plan this is very alike to Ahsan Manzil, a building of its contemporary period. Two archways connect this to the Ruplal and Raghunath block which are treated differently. The western archway is topped by an essentially oriental gabled detail which seems to have a later addition. The eastern archway, on the other hand, continues in the same style as the central block. This block consists of recreational facilities, such as ballrooms, classical music hall etc. There are double veranda on both the sides of the block which makes the place airy and create indoor outdoor relationships. Because of huge openings in every wall the rooms are adequately lit naturally. The immense thickness of the wall protected the building thermally.

Structural features: Central Block This block is constructed of load bearing walls; columns are used in veranda and the portico. 2’6” thick wall and entirely constructed of brick masonry because of 22’ high dance hall.

Floors made of brick tiles that rest on the wooden cross beam system, and then a thick layer of lime concrete is applied over it. The most attractive feature of the dance halls is its wooden floors which are made of wooden planks, rest on thick wooden beams. Circular Columns are constructed of circular bricks. Most of the openings are arched and made of brick that exclude the use of lintels. Wooden staircases supported by crossbeam system. Brick as the main structural material, all are load bearing walls. Brick tiles are used to construct the floors. Lime concrete as bonding material also used in the floor of dance hall. Wood in the construction of beam system. Wooden planks are used in the floor of the dance hall. Steel I beams are used as the reinforcements in the beams. Bricks of different dimensions are used in constructing the columns, arches etc. Mosaic is used in the intricate decorations on the ceiling of the dance hall and other decorative places. Marble slabs were used on the floor of the veranda. Colored glass was used to create the dramatic space quality. Mirrors were used on the ceiling of the dance hall.

== Backgrounds ==
Rooplal Das Belonging to a Mahishya ,family, He was Jamindar and a merchant. He was the first educated member of his family. In the Praveshika Exam he stood first and got a scholarship of tk 10 and he was a great fan of music. He did not spend much on social causes but he spent a lot for the musicians. Rooplal house is well known to have hosted a lot of cultural activity of the time. Gurus of Indian classical music like Ostad Alauddin Khan, Ostad Wall Ullah Khan and Lakshmi Devi regularly hosted shows. In 1888 when Lord Dafrin was invited to visit Dhaka by the Elites of that time, a competition was held between Ahsan Manzil and Rooplal house and Rooplal house won by the vote of the elites; this added political importance to Rooplal house at that time. For showing off their social status they spent tk 45000 to decorate it.

After the earthquake of 1897 the watchtower of the house broke down and the family shifted their home to another place. The great house was abandoned for 50 years. The story of Shyam Bazaar starts from after the Dash family left the house. There was a garden on the eastern side of Rooplal House named 'Roghubabur Bagaan' and there was a pool named 'Shayambabur Pool'. After the family left the house the garden lost its beauty because of no maintenance. The market then started here and was known as Shyam Bazar. The bund area was developed as a rich residential area which was occupied mainly by the high class European officers and merchants. But by 1930 the riverfront lost its residential quality and was developed as a highly commercial area.

The Das family left Dhaka after the partition in 1947. In 1958 the Jamall family purchased Ruplal House and some other houses in Dhaka in exchange with their house in the posh locality of Auckland Square in Kolikota. Mr. Mohammed Siddique Jamall and his younger brother Mr. Ibrahim Siddique Jamall became co-owners of Ruplal House and renamed it "Jamall House". Mr. Mohammed Siddique Jamall and his son Mr. Hussain Siddique Jamall lived on the 1st floor. Another son Mr. Habib Siddique Jamall lived on the top floor. The ground floor was used as a police camp and revenue office. Mr Mohammed Siddique Jamall and family left for India and West in 1976. Most of his and his brother Mr. Ibrahim Siddique Jamall's grandchildren migrated to USA, UK, Canada, Australia, and the Gulf and may claim ownership. A portion of the 1st Floor of Jamall House block was used as Prince Karim Ago Khan Preparatory school from 1958. In 1973 the house was converted to a college but only lasted for 16 days. Later it was used as the residential accommodation of the family of staff of JCO and NCO army officers. The Roghunath block is under private ownership since 1948 AD. At present the building functions both as a residential and commercial complex. It is heavily encroached by the spice and vegetable vendors and by a colony of unauthorized squatters who have erected shanty hovels against the building. The east block is owned and used by a private owner as residence at first floor and warehouse at the ground floor.

Farashganj

The history begins with Farashganj. In 1730 the French came to Dhaka to set up their businesses. They bought a house on the bank of the Buriganga from Jamindar Sheikh Mutiullah and made their Kuthi in the place currently known as Ahsan Manzil. The Naib Nazim, Nawazish Ali Khan gave permission to the French to build their market in the area, and it was named 'Frenchganj1, but to the locals it came to be known as 'Farashganj'. The French could not profit much so they left by 1784. The Armenian Jamindar Pogose leased the property from British government.

Buckland Bund

In 1680 A.D. a bund was erected along the bank of the river Buriganga to protect the riverbank from flooding and erosion, and to provide a recreational area along Buriganga. In 1864, the bund was constructed by Commissioner C.T. Buckland and came to be known as Buckland Bund. The Buckland Bund was a new gathering place for the people of Dhaka; they used to come here to enjoy the view of the river. According to the autobiography of Ridoai Nath Mojhumder, 12 steel benches were provided there at first which were not sufficient so 8 more benches were added. The crowd visiting the Buckland Bund at that time proved that it was a very refreshing place and even today after almost 300 years the place is still used as a social gathering place by the local people. The construction of the bund quickly transformed the area into a very posh place and a lot of Zamindars started to erect their mansions on and around this bund.

== Present condition ==
Today, the Ruplal House is occupied by local spice and vegetable merchants and a colony of unauthorized squatters. It has recently been "protected" by the Bengali Department of Archaeology; but a colony of squatters still continue to occupy parts of the building. Action is urgently needed to preserve this artistic architectural structure from further decay. Currently the surroundings of the Ruplal House, including the Buckland Dam area, consists of one of the biggest spice markets of Dhaka. Wholesale traders of different types of spices have occupied the entire area. Inside the house, some families are even residing. The other part of the complex, known as the Raghunath Block, was handed over to a family of Indian origin by the descendants of Raghunath Babu. A good number of spice shops are currently operating in this part as well.

== See also ==
- List of archaeological sites in Bangladesh
- Burdwan House
