= Northbrook Hall =

Coordinates: 23°42′16.5″N 90°24′44.8″E

- নর্থব্রুক হল
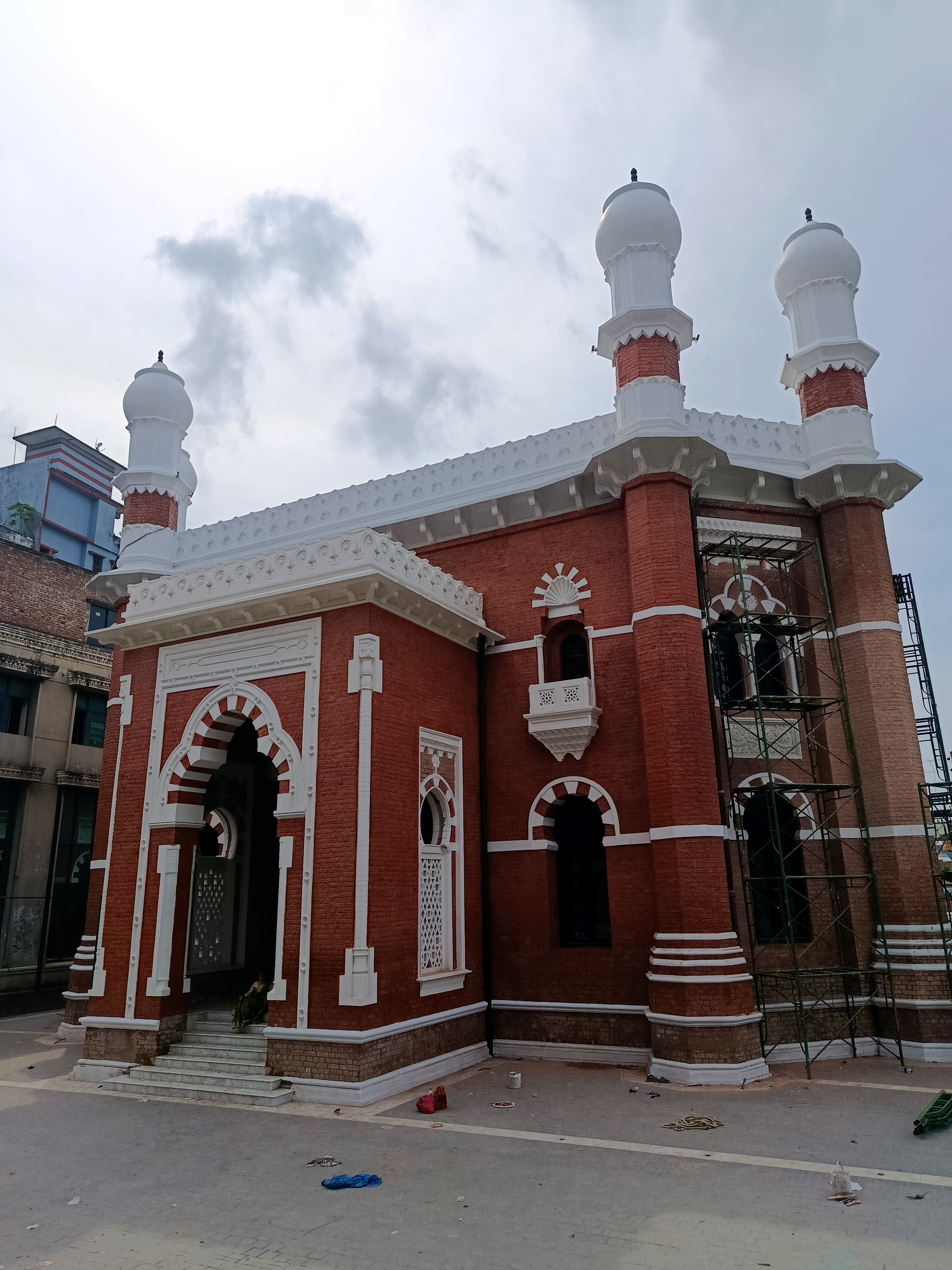
- Northbrook Hall as seen from the entrance
- Interactive map of the Northbrook Hall area

General information
- Location: Dhaka, Bangladesh
- Completed: 1880
- Owner: Dhaka South City Corporation
- List of Old Dhaka Heritage Sites

Northbrook Hall (also known as Lalkuthi) was originally built as a town hall during the British period. It is situated at Farashgonj road in Old Dhaka, Bangladesh, on the north bank of the Buriganga River.

== History ==
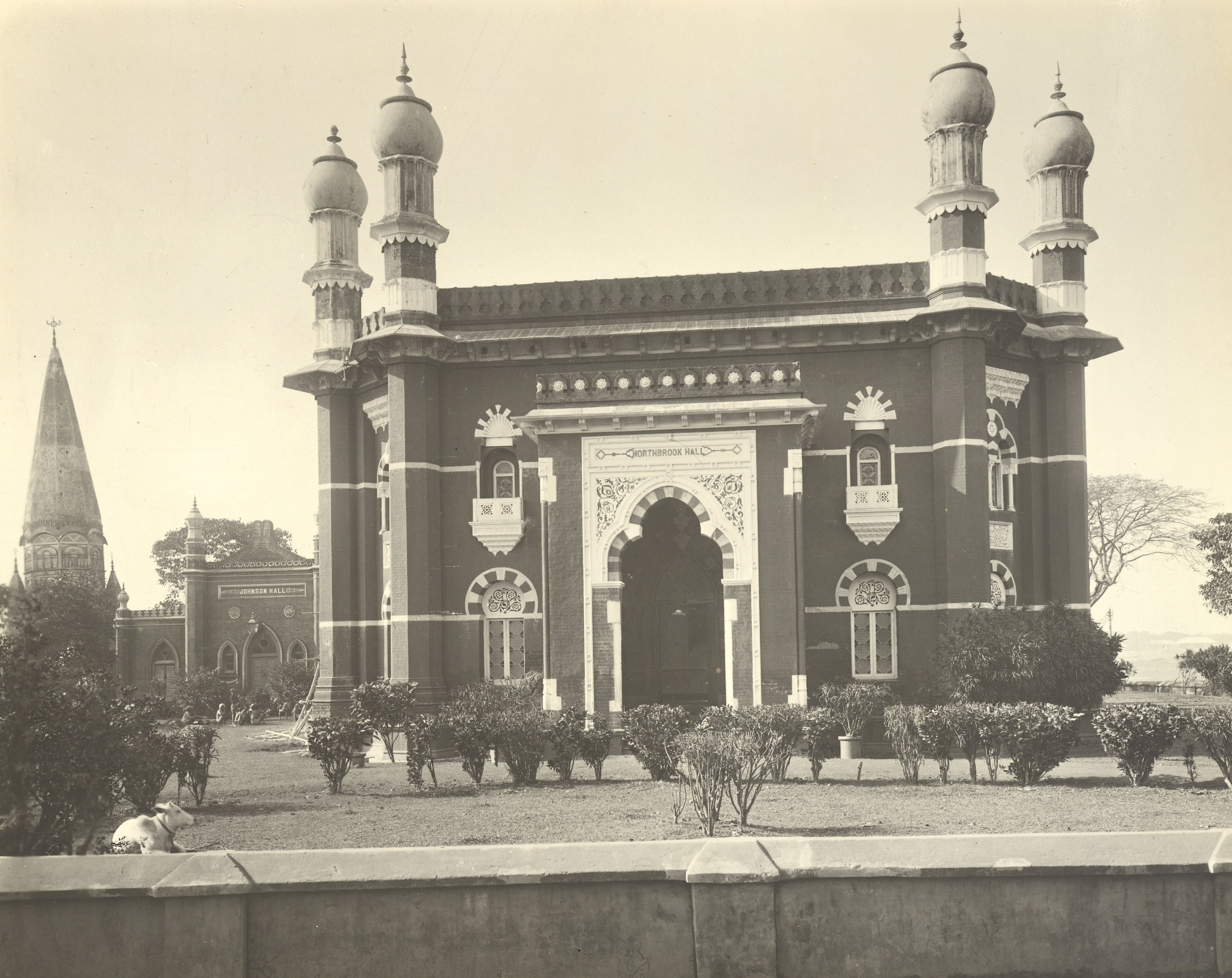
Northbrook Hall in 1904

Indian Governor Thomas George Baring and Lord Northbrook, the Viceroy of India between 1872 and 1876, came to visit Dhaka. In order to make their visit memorable, In 1874, Raja Rai Bahadur, along with eminent Zamidars and affluent citizens of Dhaka, donated 10 thousand and 5 thousand taka each to build the Town Hall in 1879. Abhay Chandra Das was the committee secretary. In 1880, the Commissioner of Dhaka inaugurated it and the personal orchestra of Nawab Abdul Ghani was brought to entertain the commissioner and the guests on inauguration.

On 8 February 1882, a public library was added on the south-east side of the Hall. To establish the library, the Maharaja of Tripura donated 1000 TK, the Zamidar of Baliati Brojendro Kumar Roy 1000 TK, Queen Shornomoi 700 TK, Kalikhrishno 500 TK and Bishaishori Devi donated 500 TK. In 1887, the library opened with 1000 books. It was named the Northbrook Public Library and became known for its literary collection. Many books were ruined during the 1971 Liberation War.

A clubhouse was added to the south-side and called Johnson Hall. At Northbrook Hall, Nobel Laureate poet Rabindranath Tagore was honoured by Dhaka Municipality and the People's Association on 7 February 1926. In 1950, Northbrook Hall was used as a telegram office, and later as the Central Women's College. The building is the property of Dhaka South City Corporation.

== Architecture ==
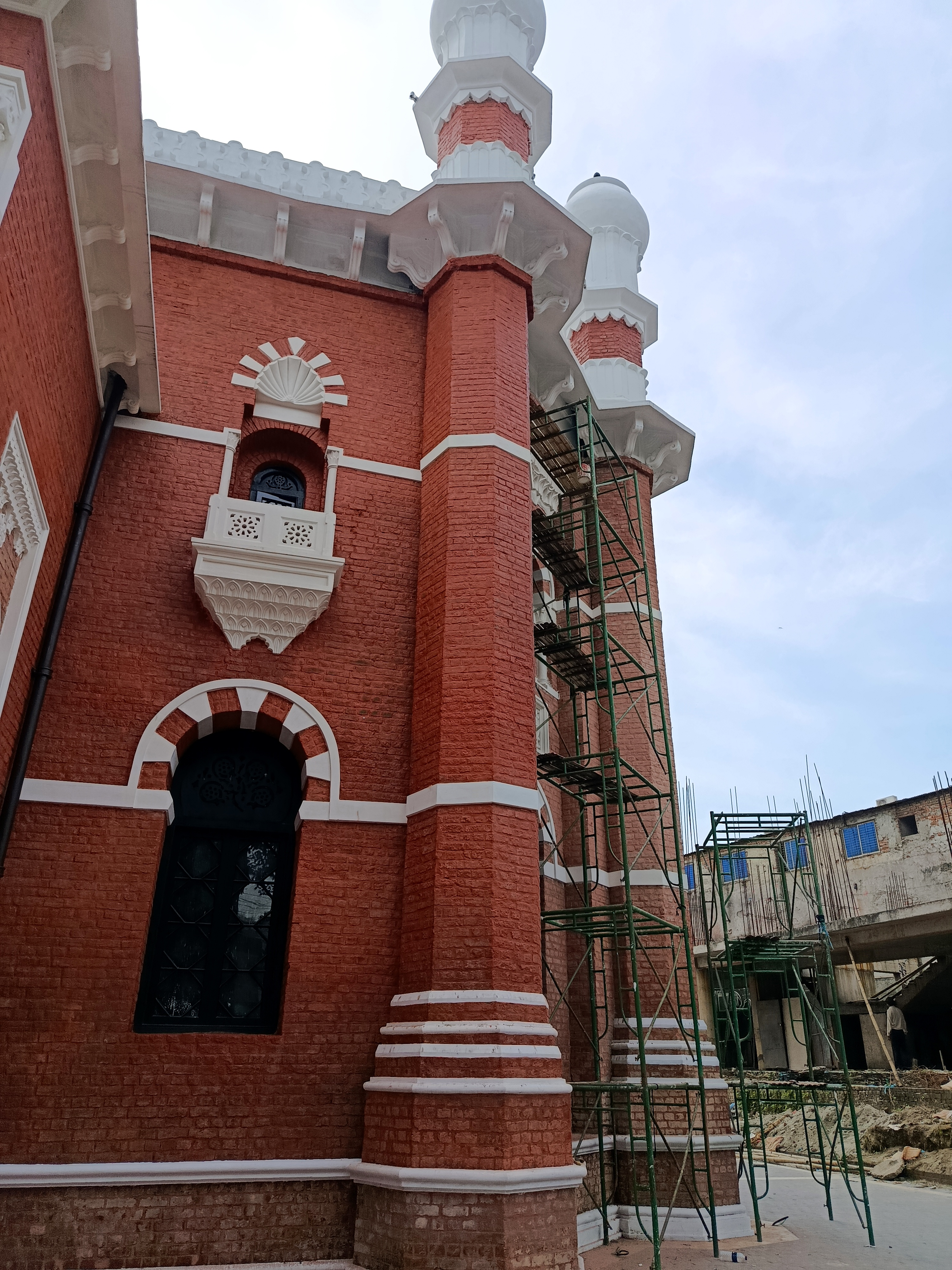
The hall blends Indo-Saracenic and Moorish architecture, including jharoka balconies and Moorish arches

Northbrook Hall is an Indo-Saracen building, and a fusion of Mughal architecture and European Renaissance architectural styles. The semi-circular horseshoe arches contain the main entrance on the north side. The four octagonal minarets on the north side, along with pinnacles and ornamental parapet, show the Muslim and Mughal features. The windows, doors and walls were ornate, following the European style, but the domes at the top of the building were ornate following the Muslim style.

== Current situation ==
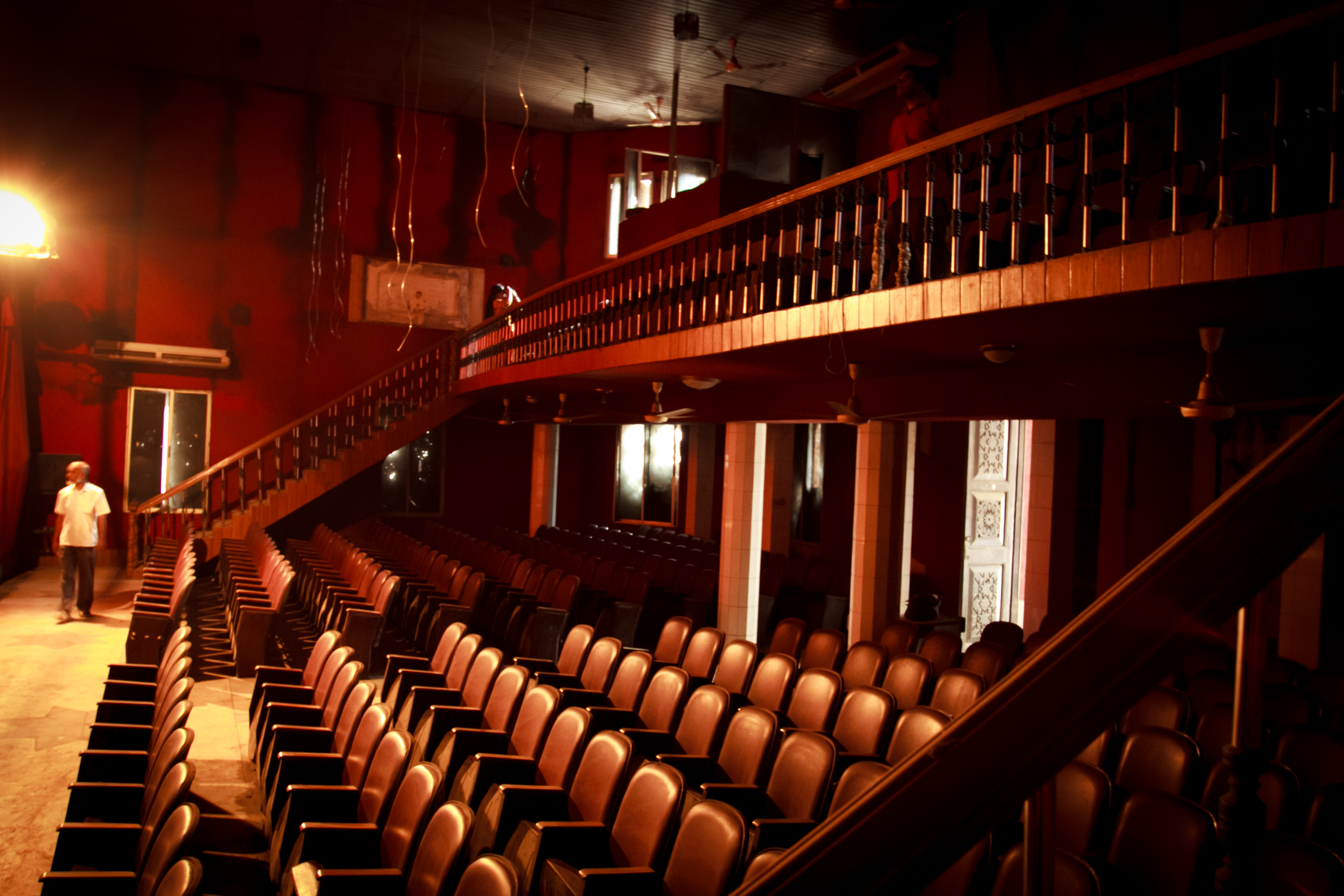
Seating inside Northbrook Hall

The Buriganga River could be seen from the Northbrook Hall when it was built, but by 1930 the riverfront and the river was obscured. The area lost its importance and residential character and had transformed into a commercial area. In 1998, a government education office was built by the side of Northbrook Hall, part of which is now used by a decorator, and a pentagram fountain in front of the north entrance now completely obscures the view.

Northbrook Hall is one of the protected buildings under the Department of Archaeology. Over the years, several phases of restoration work were undertaken by the Department of Archaeology, in coordination with the Dhaka Municipality Corporation. However, as the building is more than 130 years old, on few instances, comparatively major restoration building has been actively in use for over a century, only minor restorations were required, especially for the condensation of the plasterwork and paint. The restoration works at Northbrook Hall were more convenient for the Department of Archaeology, as the Dhaka Municipality Corporation actively supported the projects; along with the users, the local community. As there has been no disruption in the use of the building for over a century, the original details of the jalli work and surface ornamentations has survived in very good shape. Also, as the building is actively used and in relatively good shape compared to the other vulnerable heritage, no special fund was required for the conservation (as seen in the other examples like Panamnagar). The users of the building took partial responsibility of the minor restoration works under the supervision of the Department of Archaeology. Northbrook Hall can be considered one of the more successful formal conservation projects undertaken by the Department of Archaeology.

One of the major threats for the heritage building is the encroaching structures, like an assembly hall and a few community centers built surrounding the building. Another critical factor is the 'List of Protected Heritage' published in 2009. Before the list was published, the collaboration between the local community, Dhaka Municipal Corporation and the Department of Archaeology was flexible.

== See also ==
- List of archaeological sites in Bangladesh
