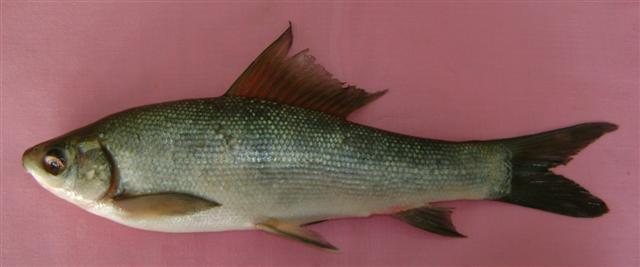

Conservation status
- Least Concern (IUCN 3.1)

Scientific classification
- Kingdom: Animalia
- Phylum: Chordata
- Class: Actinopterygii
- Order: Cypriniformes
- Family: Cyprinidae
- Subfamily: Labeoninae
- Genus: Labeo
- Species: L. gonius

Binomial name
- Labeo gonius (Hamilton, 1822)

Synonyms
- Cyprinus gonius Hamilton, 1822; Rohita gonius (Hamilton, 1822); Rohita chalybeata Valenciennes, 1842; Osteochilus chalybeatus (Valenciennes, 1842); Labeo microlepidotus Valenciennes, 1842; Rohita microlepidota (Valenciennes, 1842)

= Kuria labeo =

Species of fish

The Kuria labeo (Labeo gonius) (Assamese: কুঁঢ়ি, romanized: kurhi, কুৰিহা kuriha; Bengali: ঘনিয়া, romanized: ghonia, গৈন্না gôinna) is a species of fish in the carp family, Cyprinidae. It is native to Pakistan, India, Bangladesh, and Burma, and it is known from Afghanistan and Nepal.

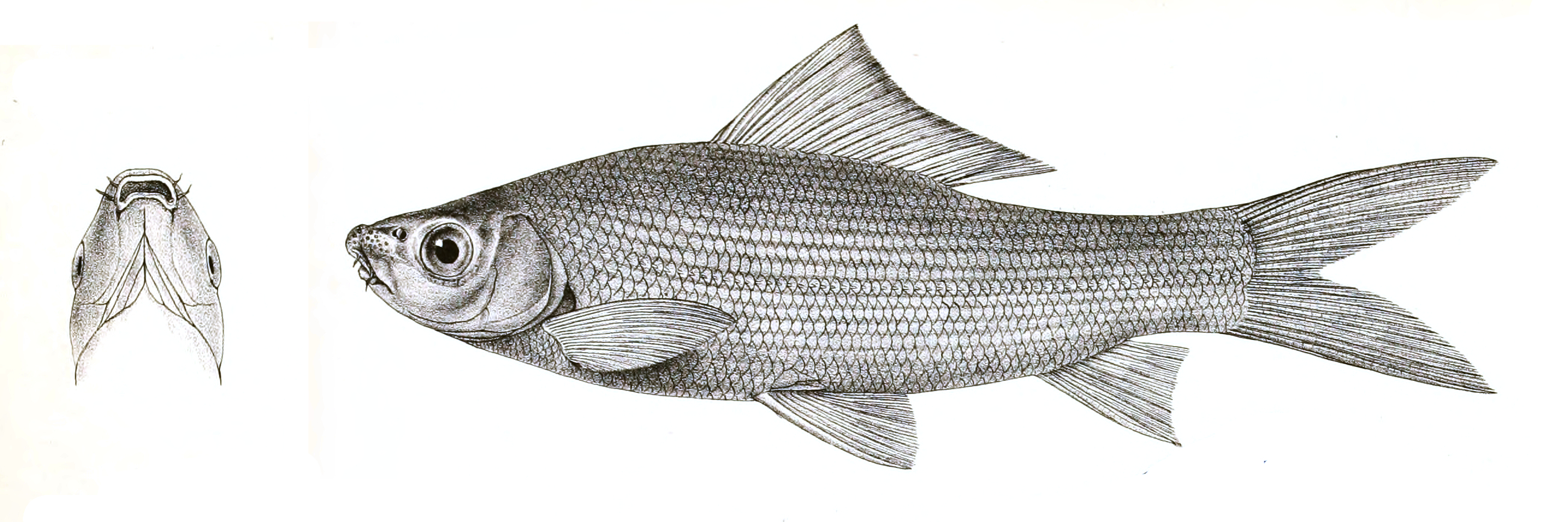

The fish has been known to reach 1.5 meters in length and weigh 1.4 kilograms. It is a freshwater fish usually found in rivers, and it is sometimes seen in paddy fields. It spawns during the monsoon around July and August.

This fish is reared in aquaculture. It can be reared with some other carps, but it tends to compete with certain species.

The species is widespread and common in some areas, and it is not considered threatened on a large scale. It may face potential threats from overexploitation and degradation of its habitat.
