= Buriganga River =

River in Bangladesh

Coordinates: 23°38′N 90°26′E

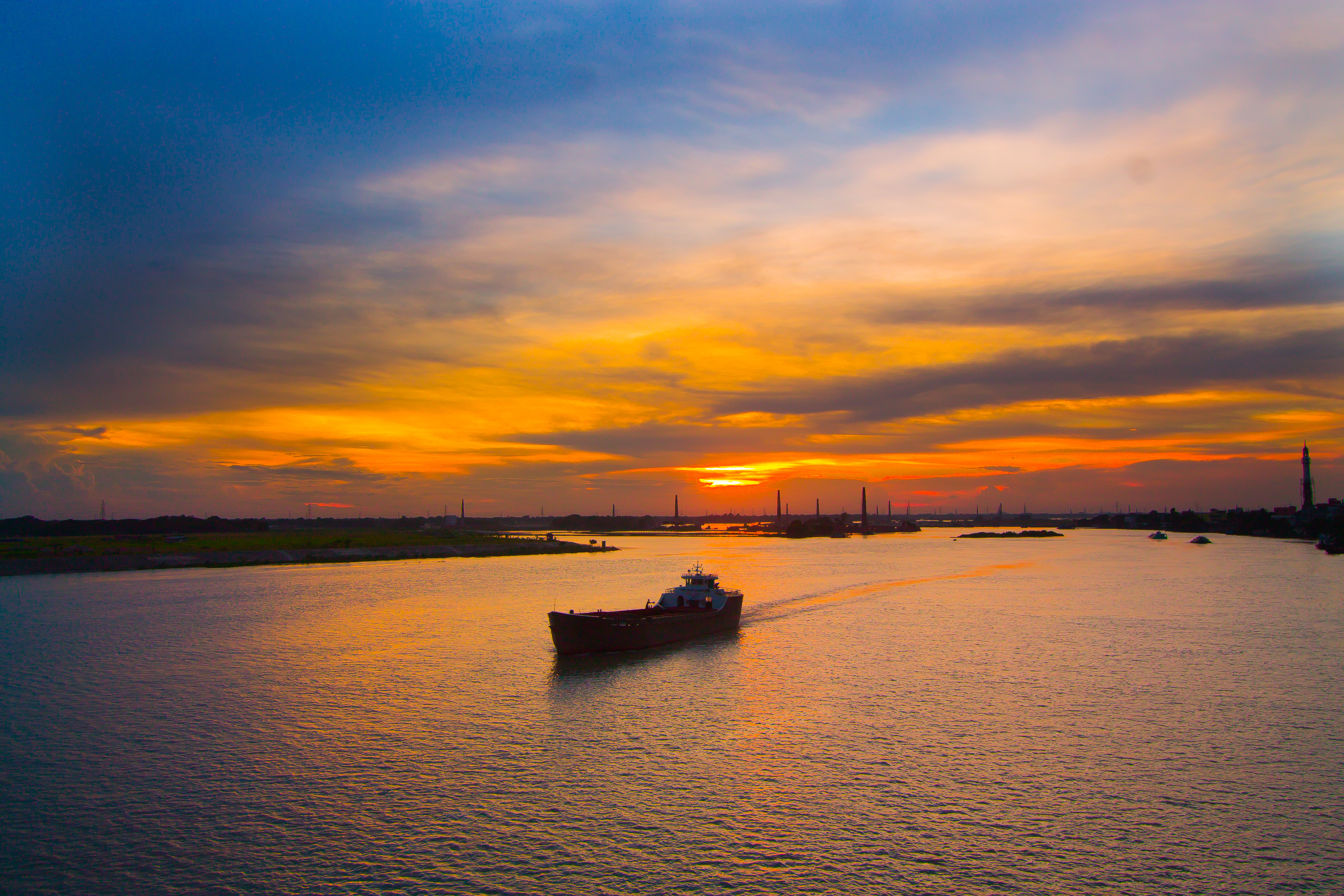
- A launch sails from Sadarghat on the Buriganga

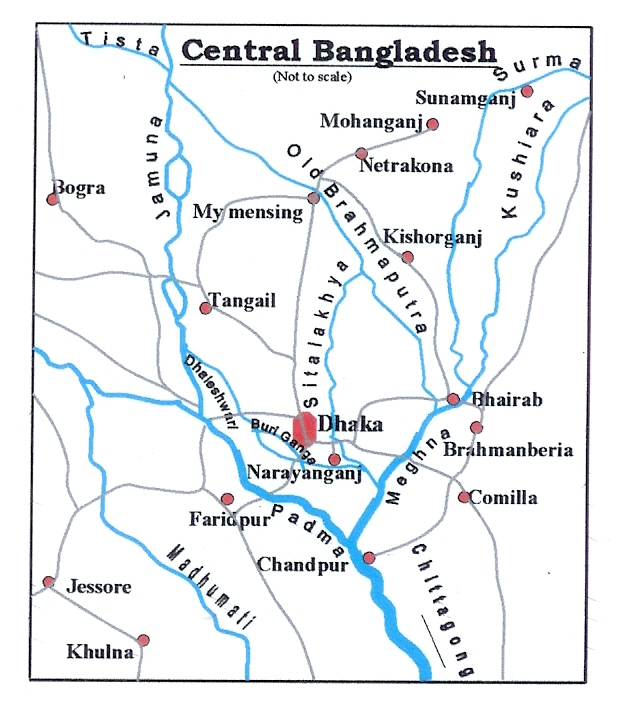
- Native name: বুড়িগঙ্গা নদী (Bengali)

Location
- Country: Bangladesh
- City: Dhaka

Physical characteristics
- Source: Dhaleshwari River
  - location: near Kalatia
- Mouth: Dhaleshwari River
  - location: about 3 km (2 mi) southwest of Fatullah
- Length: 27 km (17 mi)

Buriganga (Bengali: বুড়িগঙ্গা; lit. 'Old Ganges') is a river in Bangladesh which flows past Dhaka. It stretches 29 km, passing through south and west of the capital. The river was the driving factor for Mughals to choose this city as the capital of Bengal Province. The Sadarghat or Dhaka River Port lies on this river, which is the busiest river port in the country. It ranks among the most polluted rivers in the world.

== Importance ==
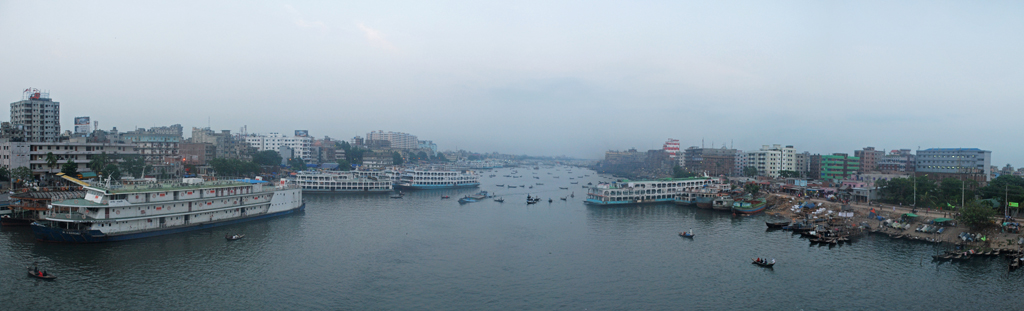
View of Buriganga River from the bridge in Dhaka

The Buriganga is economically very important to Dhaka. Launches and country boats provide connection to other parts of Bangladesh, a largely riverine country. Through Buriganga, Dhaka is connected almost to all parts of the country. The middle class, who can not afford a car, generally uses launch to get to different locations.

== Pollution ==
In the 20th century the water table and river became polluted by polyethylene waste and other hazardous substances from demolished buildings near the river banks.

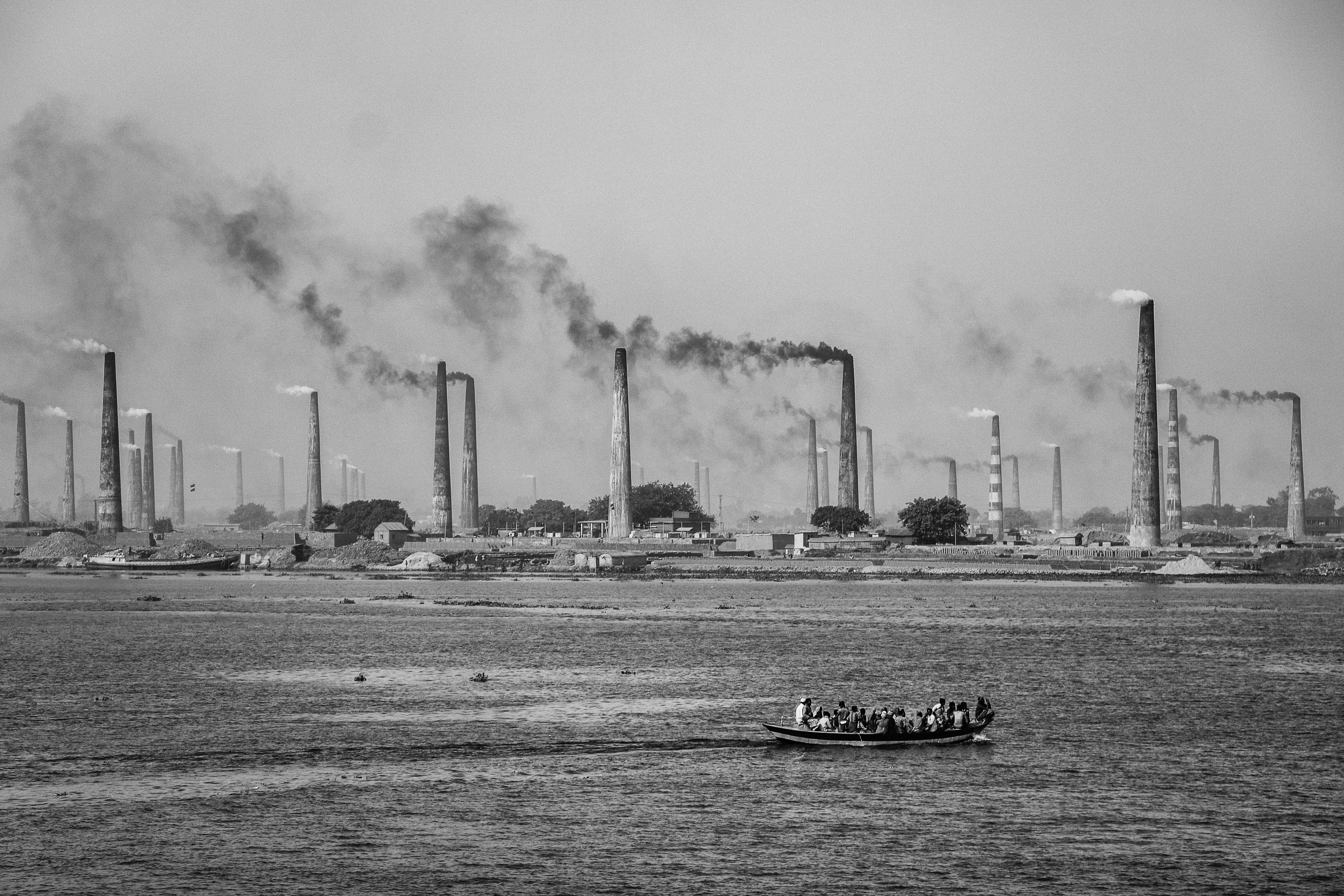
Dhaka heavily industrializing on the banks of Buriganga.

The Buriganga river ranks among the most polluted rivers in the country. The chemical waste of mills and factories, household waste, medical waste, sewage, dead animals, plastics, and oil are some of the Buriganga's many pollutants. The city of Dhaka discharges about 4,500 tons of solid waste every day, and most of it is released into the Buriganga. According to the Bangladesh Department of Environment, 21,600 cubic metres (5.7 million US gallons) of toxic waste are released into the river by the tanneries every day. Experts identified nine industrial areas in and around the capital city as the primary sources of river pollution: Tongi, Tejgaon, Hazaribagh, Tarabo, Narayanganj, Savar, Gazipur, Dhaka Export Processing Zone and Ghorashal. Most of the industrial units of these areas have no industrial wastewater treatment plants of their own.

According to the Dhaka Water and Sewerage Authority (WASA), about 12,000 cubic metres (420,000 cu ft) of untreated wastewater are released into the lake from Tejgaon, Badda and Mohakhali industrial areas every day. The wastewater mostly comes from garment washing and dyeing plants. Textile industries annually discharge as much as 56 million tonnes of waste and 0.5 million tonnes of sludge. Sewage is also released into the Buriganga.

The river is so choked with pollution that even in rainy season, the water is pitch black. The stench is extreme even if you are on top of a bridge. The dissolved oxygen, which is essential for marine life is only 3.01 mg/L in Buriganga, while at least 5 mg per liter is needed for aquatic life. A 2025 study by Jahangirnagar University found alarming concentrations of heavy metals such as lead, cadmium, chromium, mercury and arsenic in both the water and sediment of the river, levels that far exceed national and international safety limits.

Because of Dhaka's heavy reliance on river transport for goods, including food, the Buriganga receives especially high amounts of food waste since unusable or rotting portions of fruits, vegetables, and fish are thrown into the river.

== History ==
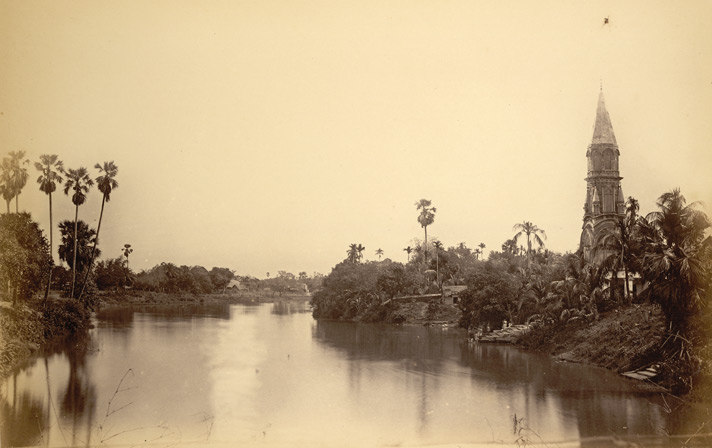
View looking along the river Buriganga towards the city of Dhaka situated on the left bank. A Hindu temple tower stands at the water's edge (1875).

According to R. C. Majumdar, in the distant past, a course of the Ganges river probably used to reach the Bay of Bengal through the Dhaleshwari River. The Buriganga originated from the Dhaleshwari in the south of Savar, near Dhaka

When the Mughal completed the conquest of South Asia, they made Dhaka the capital of Bengal Province. The city was centered around Buriganga, it became the lifeline of Dhaka. When the demand for Dhaka Muslin increased, it became the main way of trading with other cities. Back then, Dhaka was one of the most prosperous cities in the world. It attracted a lot of migrants and commerce, which made the riverways even busier.

Subadar Mukarram Khan of Bengal, tried enhancing the beauty of this river. During his reign, the parts of the city located on the banks were illuminated every night. In addition, lanterns were lit on countless boats on the river. At that time, the banks of Buriganga were described with incredible beauty. In 1800, Thomas was fascinated by the Buriganga River and wrote - "Dhaka looks like Venice from a distance when the Buriganga is full of water during the rainy season."

When the country was being exploited by Pakistan and British, they had to left muslin for simply what could sell more. Different types of factories started popping up on the banks of Buriganga, the industrial waste was not treated and went directly to the river, which gave the river its signature pitch black look. The river is now considered biologically dead.

== Species ==
=== Fish ===
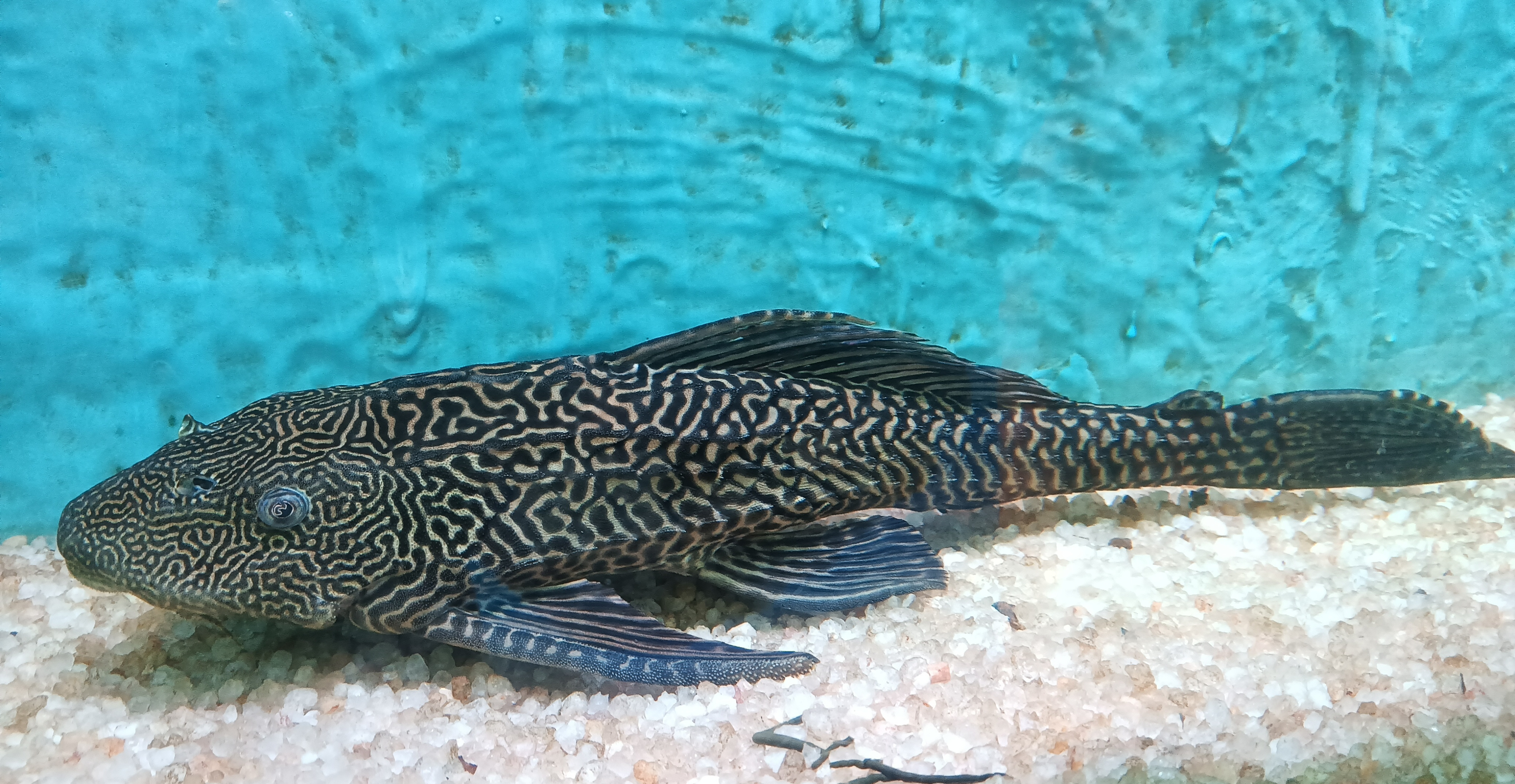
The invasive suckermouth catfish that is now called "Butcher of Buriganga"

Surveys in 2012–13 documented 56 freshwater fish species from Buriganga, in 20 families and 9 orders. Dominant groups were Cypriniformes (carps and minnows) and Siluriformes (catfishes). Notable species include: Labeo rohita (Rohu carp), Labeo calbasu (Kalibaus), Labeo gonius (Gonia), Puntius sophore (pool barb), Puntius ticto (three-spot gourami), Catla catla (Catla), Hypophthalmichthys molitrix (silver carp, exotic); the air-breathing Heteropneustes fossilis (Stinging catfish), Channa punctatus (Spotted snakehead), Channa striatus (Snakehead murrel), Wallago attu (Boal catfish); gouramis Colisa fasciata (Banded gourami) and Ctenops nobilis (Ornamental gourami); gobies Glossogobius giuris (Tank goby); and hilsa Tenualosa ilisha. Many locally important fish have declined sharply due to pollution. Since the 1980s, several invasive species of Pterygoplichthys (suckermouth catfish) have been found in the Buriganga. These species disturb the ecosystem and compete with native species for food and habitat, reducing populations of the native fish and harming the economies of fishing communities on the river.

=== Bird ===
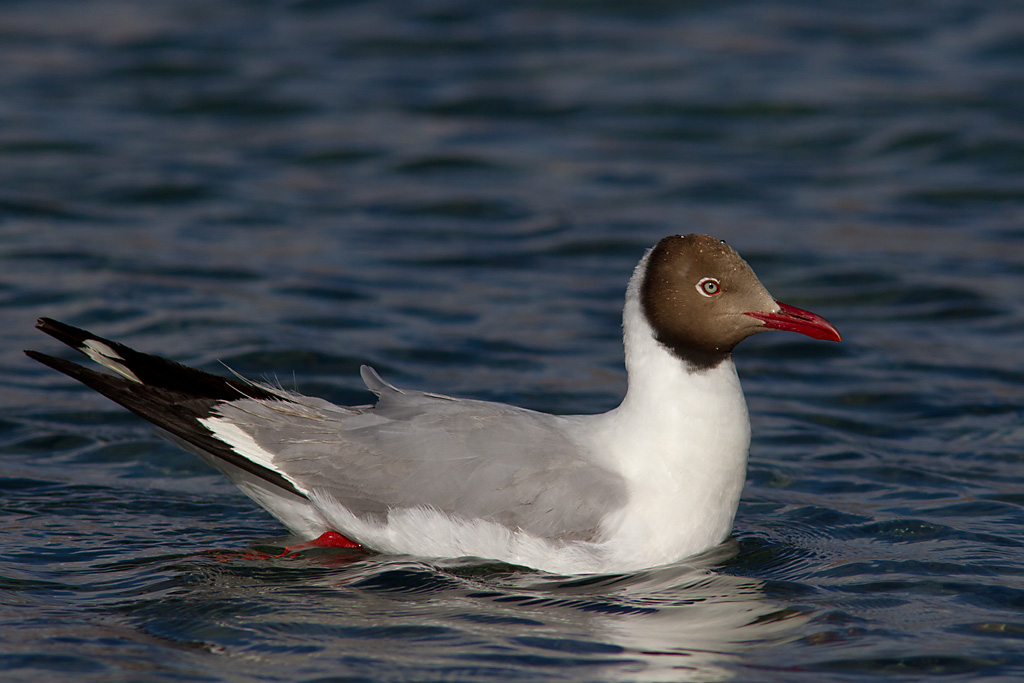
The most notable winter migrant of the river

A boat‐based year-round survey (Dec 2012–Nov 2013) recorded 38 bird species (21 families) along Buriganga between Amin Bazar and the Postogola Bridge. This included 16 songbird (passerine) species and 22 non-passerines. Notable residents and migrants observed include kingfishers (Alcedo atthis – Common Kingfisher; Ceryle rudis – Pied Kingfisher; Halcyon smyrnensis – White-throated Kingfisher) and barbet (Megalaima haemacephala – Coppersmith Barbet). Waterbirds included Larus brunnicephalus (Brown-headed Gull; winter visitor) and Larus ridibundus (Black-headed Gull; winter visitor). Raptors seen were Haliastur indus (Brahminy Kite) and Milvus migrans (Black Kite). Common urban birds such as Corvus splendens (House Crow) and Bubulcus ibis (Cattle Egret) were abundant. The Brown-headed Gull was noted as a winter migrant; globally it is IUCN Least Concern (LC) but decreasing (as “Common Gull” NT in some regional contexts). All other recorded birds are assessed as LC (e.g. kingfishers, kites, pigeons, warblers). Local Bengali names (from field notes) include: কাঠঠোকরা Kaththokra (Black-rumped Flameback), মাছরাঙা Maachranga (kingfisher), চিকন Chikon (Coppersmith Barbet).

=== Amphibians and Reptiles ===
No formal Buriganga-specific herpetological surveys have been published. Due to severe pollution, most amphibians (frogs/toads) and reptiles (snakes, lizards) likely avoid the river. (For example, a press report states “other amphibians” are essentially gone from Buriganga.) In the Dhaka region, common frogs/toads (Asian common toad Duttaphrynus melanostictus – LC; Indian skipper frog Euphlyctis cyanophlyctis – LC) and water snakes (Fowlea piscator – LC) occur in urban wetlands, but none were recorded in riverine surveys. A couple of freshwater turtles might venture into Buriganga: e.g. Lissemys punctata (Indian flapshell turtle, Bengali: কচুরিপানা কচ্ছপ – LC) and Melanochelys trijuga (Black pond turtle – VU) inhabit slow-moving waters around Dhaka. However, no recent captures from Buriganga are reported. Without targeted surveys, all reptile/amphibian records remain unspecified or absent. The national Red List (vol. 4) notes Bangladesh’s river systems host certain frogs/toads, but none are confirmed for Buriganga.

=== Mammals ===
Large or semiaquatic mammals are essentially absent from Buriganga within Dhaka’s city limits. No surveys reported any. Urban-adapted species (e.g. Rattus spp., bandicoot rats, Paradoxurus hermaphroditus – common palm civet) may live near the riverbanks, but none have been catalogued in scientific studies of the river. The otter Lutrogale perspicillata (Smooth-coated Otter, VU) occurs in cleaner rivers in Bangladesh (e.g. Karnaphuli) but has not been documented in Buriganga. Thus, mammal presence is negligible, with local names “unspecified.”

=== Aquatic Plants ===
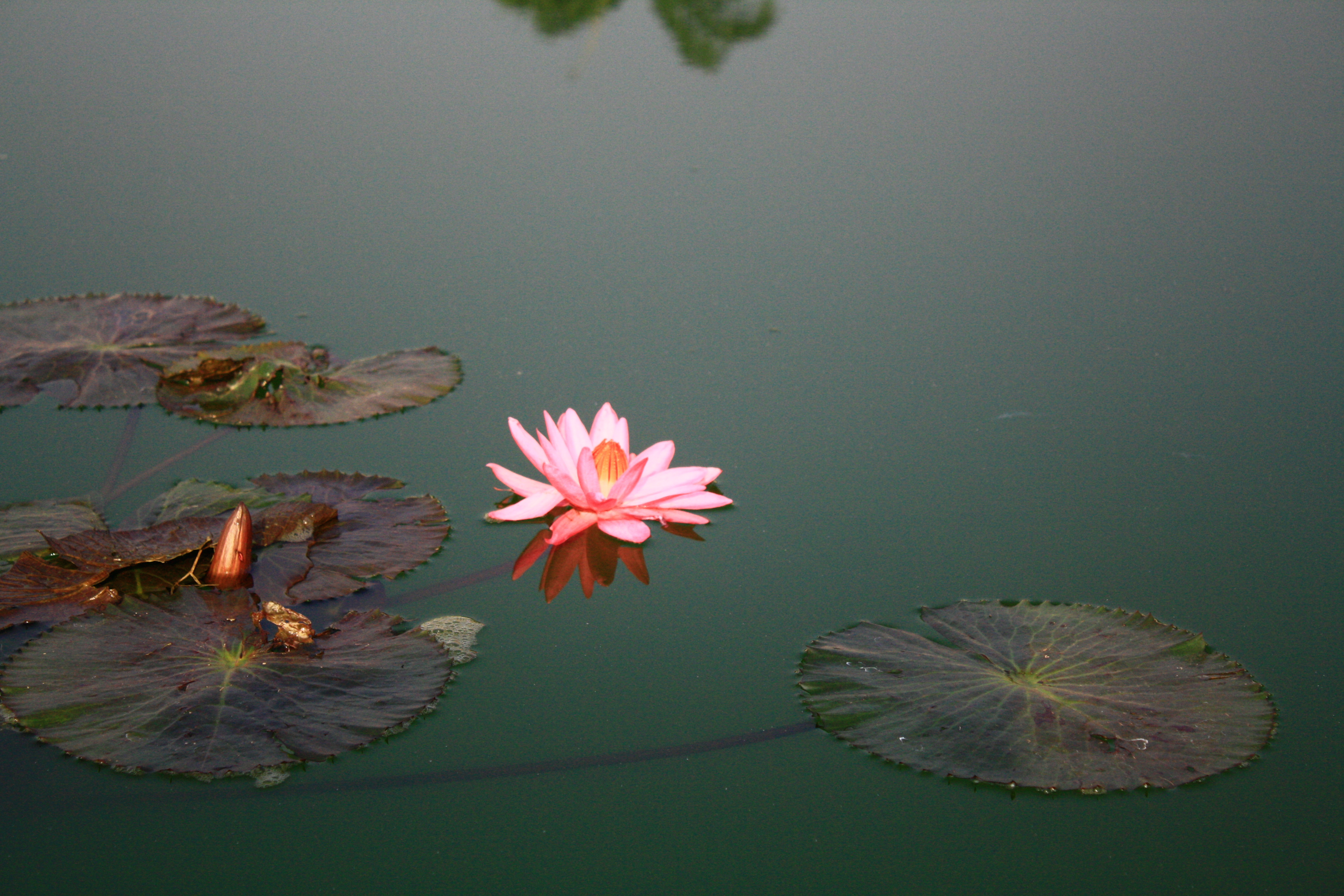
A water lily in Buriganga

Vegetation is dominated by invasive weeds and floating plants. Water hyacinth (Eichhornia crassipes; কচুরিপানা kachuripana) forms dense mats in stagnant reaches, especially post-monsoon. (A 2025 report highlights hyacinth chokes river traffic.) Other aquatic plants include water lettuce (Pistia stratiotes), and water lilies (e.g. Nymphaea nouchali, Bengal white water-lily, native – LC) along the banks. Riparian weeds such as reeds (Phragmites, LC) and sedges occur in exposed mudflats. Because Buriganga’s water is mostly toxic, true submerged vegetation (e.g. Hydrilla) is rare. Eichhornia has no global IUCN status (invasive) but is a major pollutant issue.

== Gallery ==
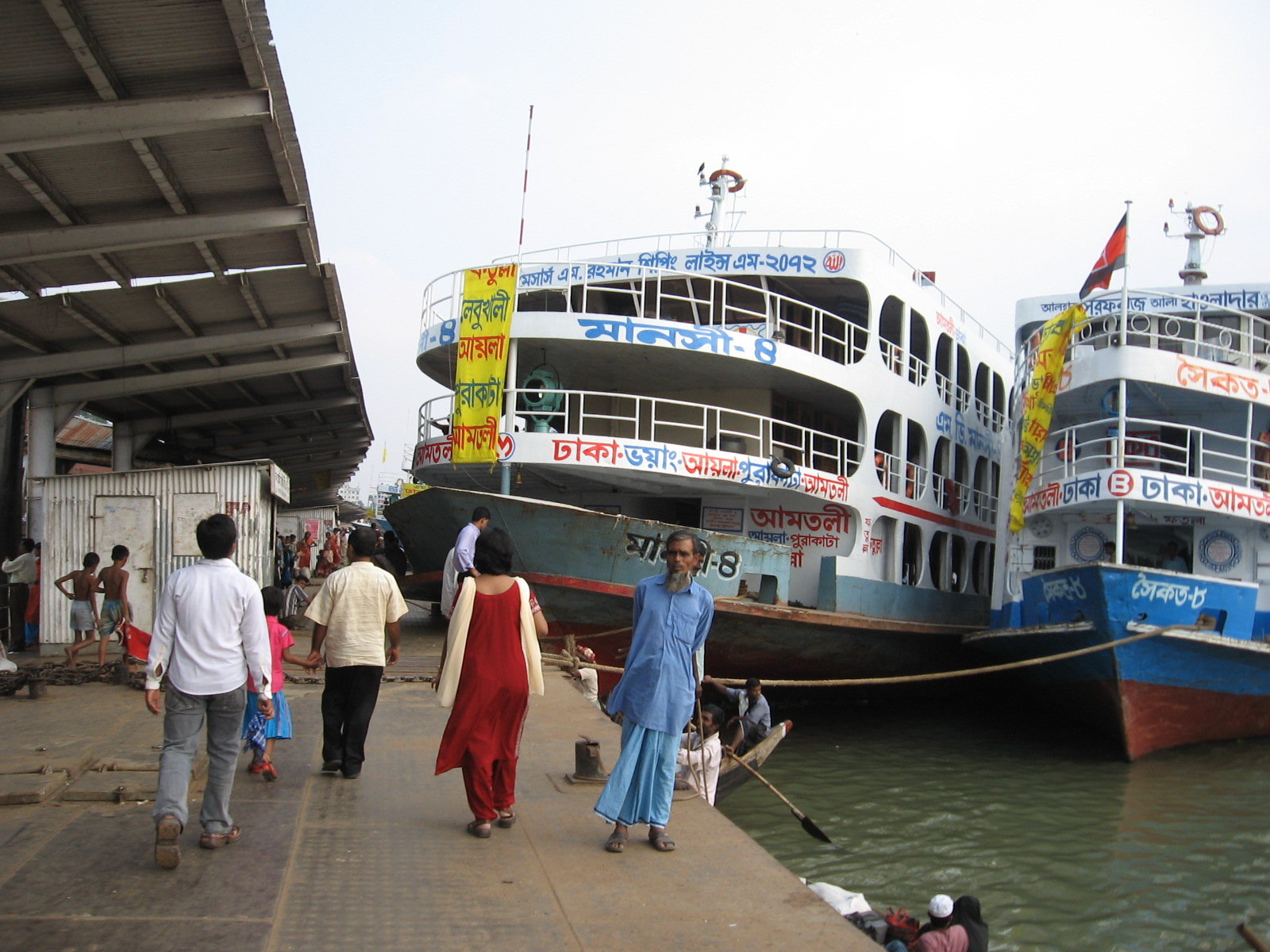
Large launches waiting at Sadarghat on the Buriganga for different destinations in Bangladesh

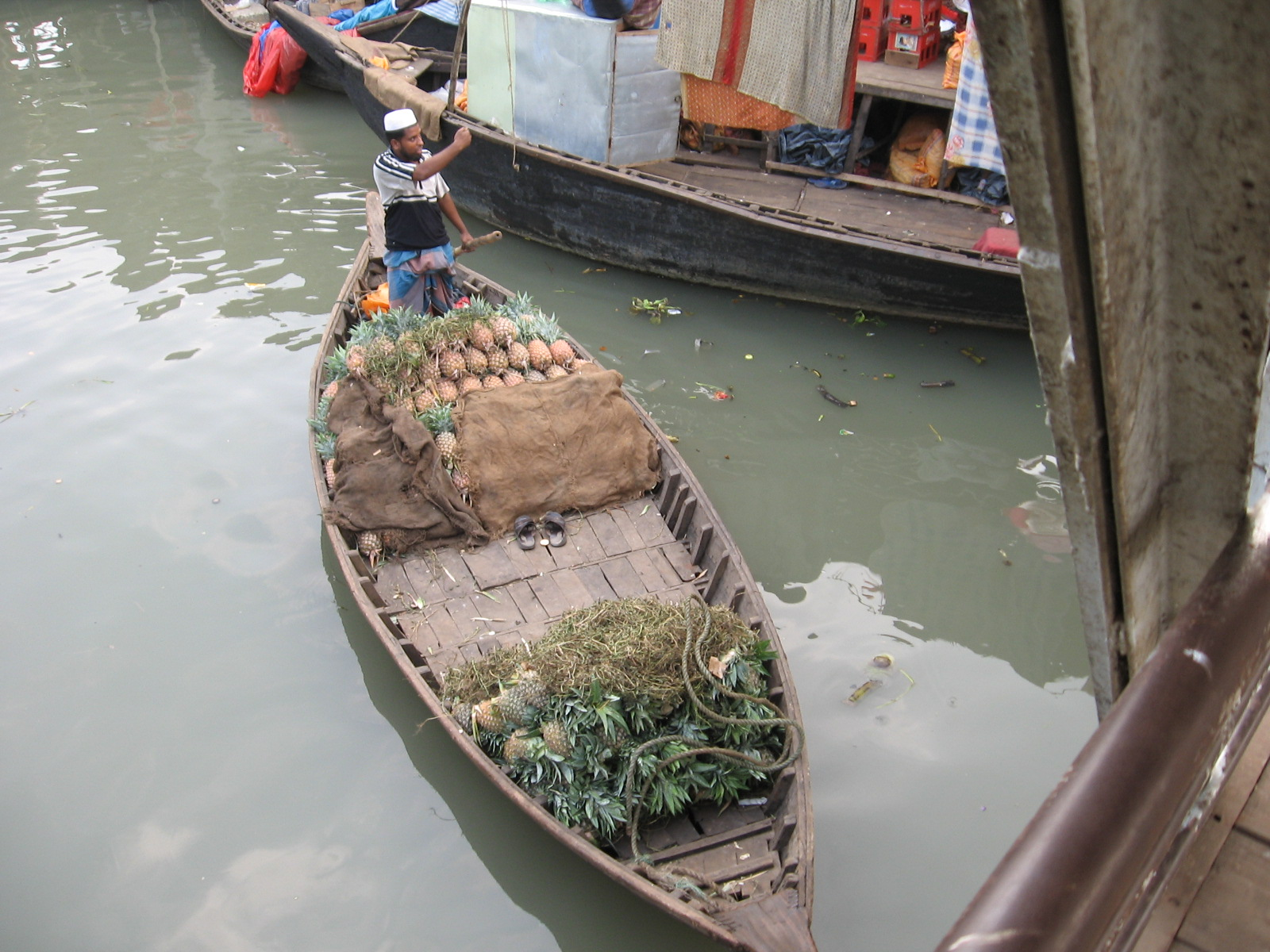
A boatman sells pineapples at Sadarghat on the Buriganga

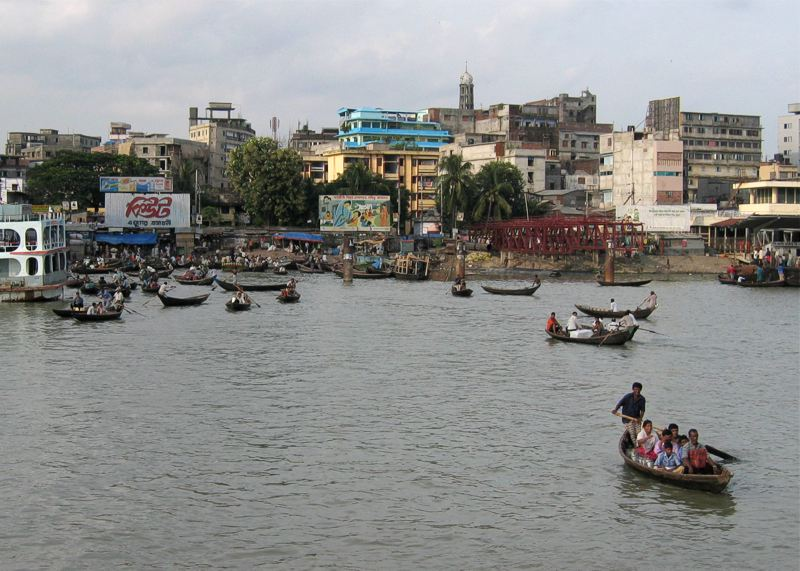
Sadarghat port on the Buriganga River, Dhaka city

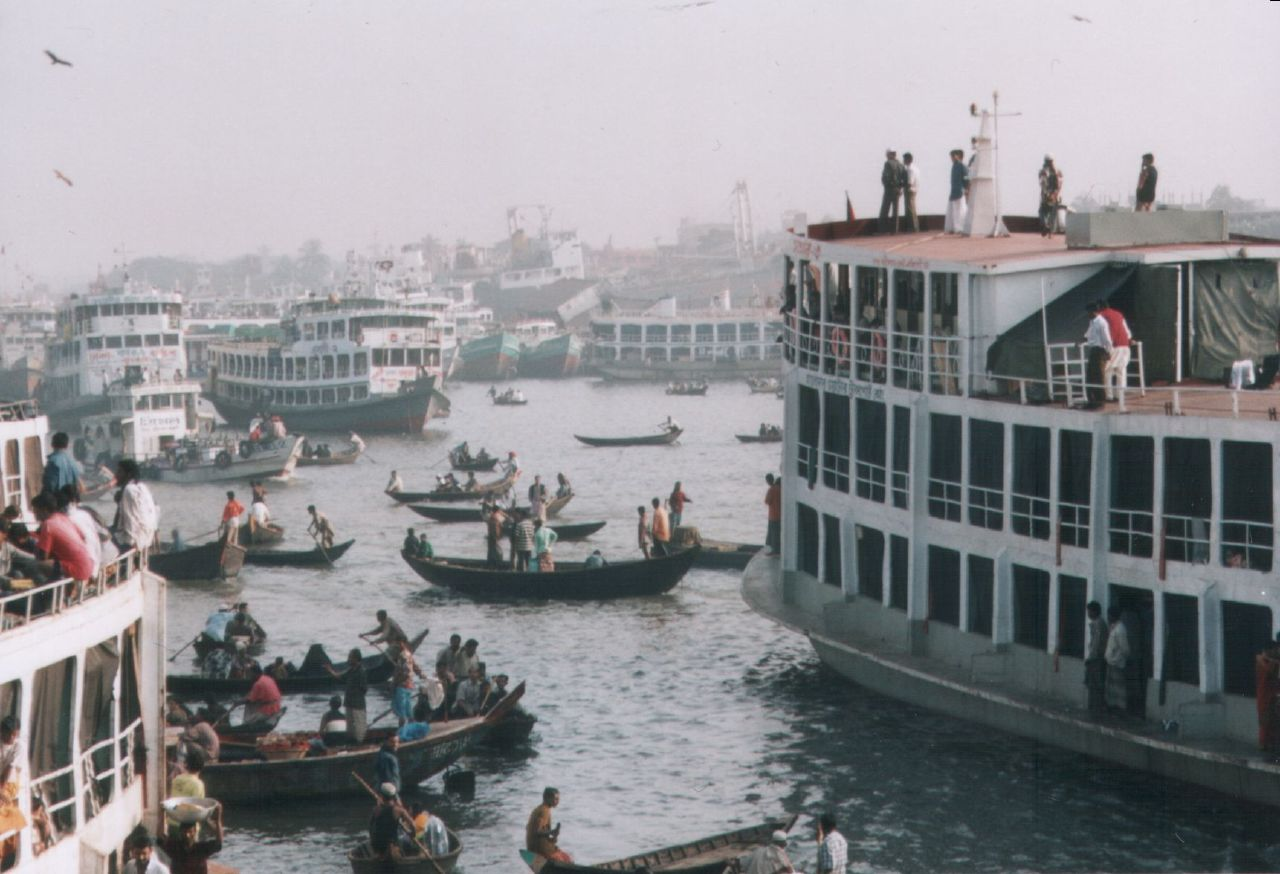
Sadarghat port on the Buriganga river is an important river transport hub

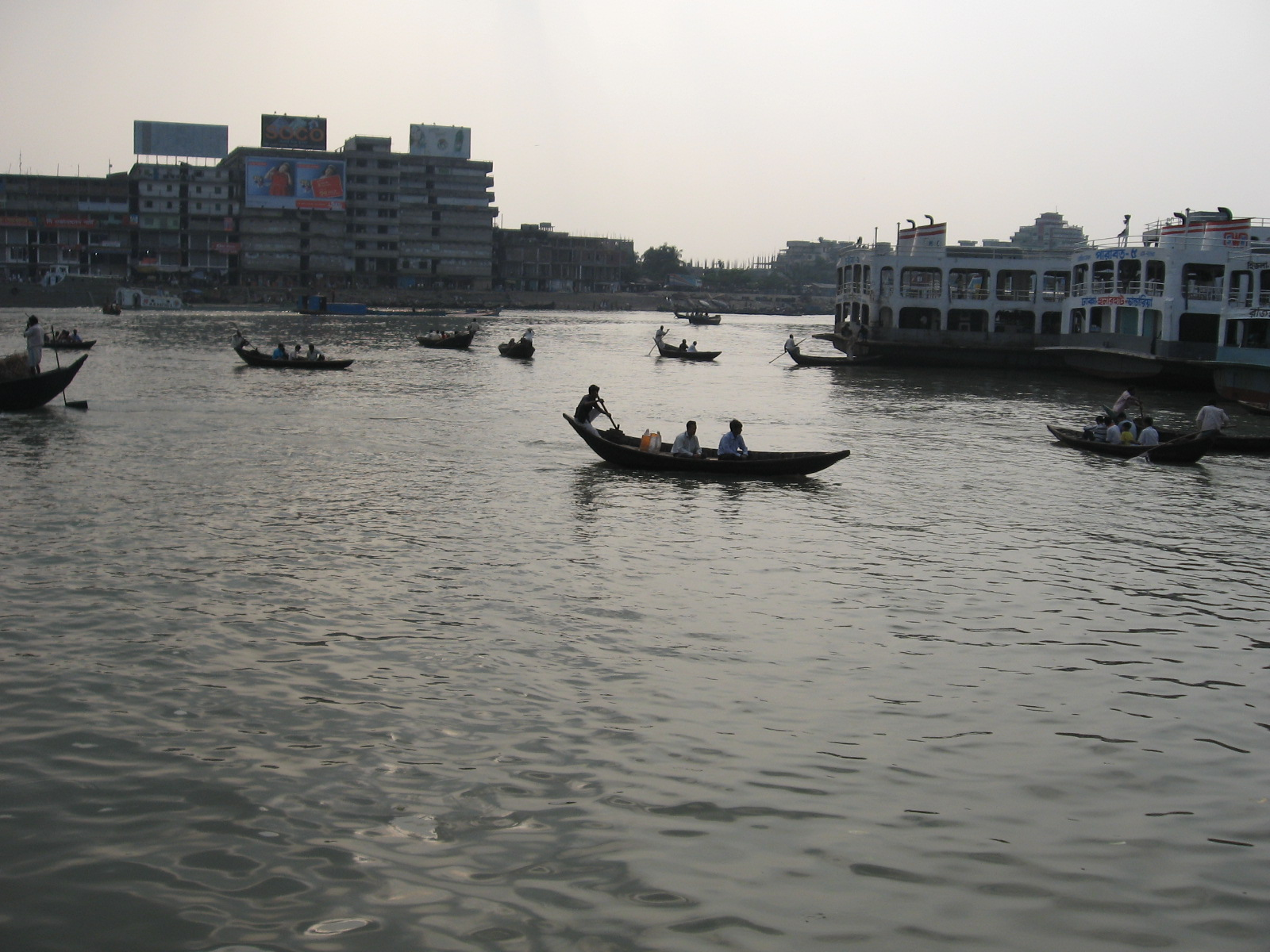
Small boats ply on the Buriganga at Sadarghat

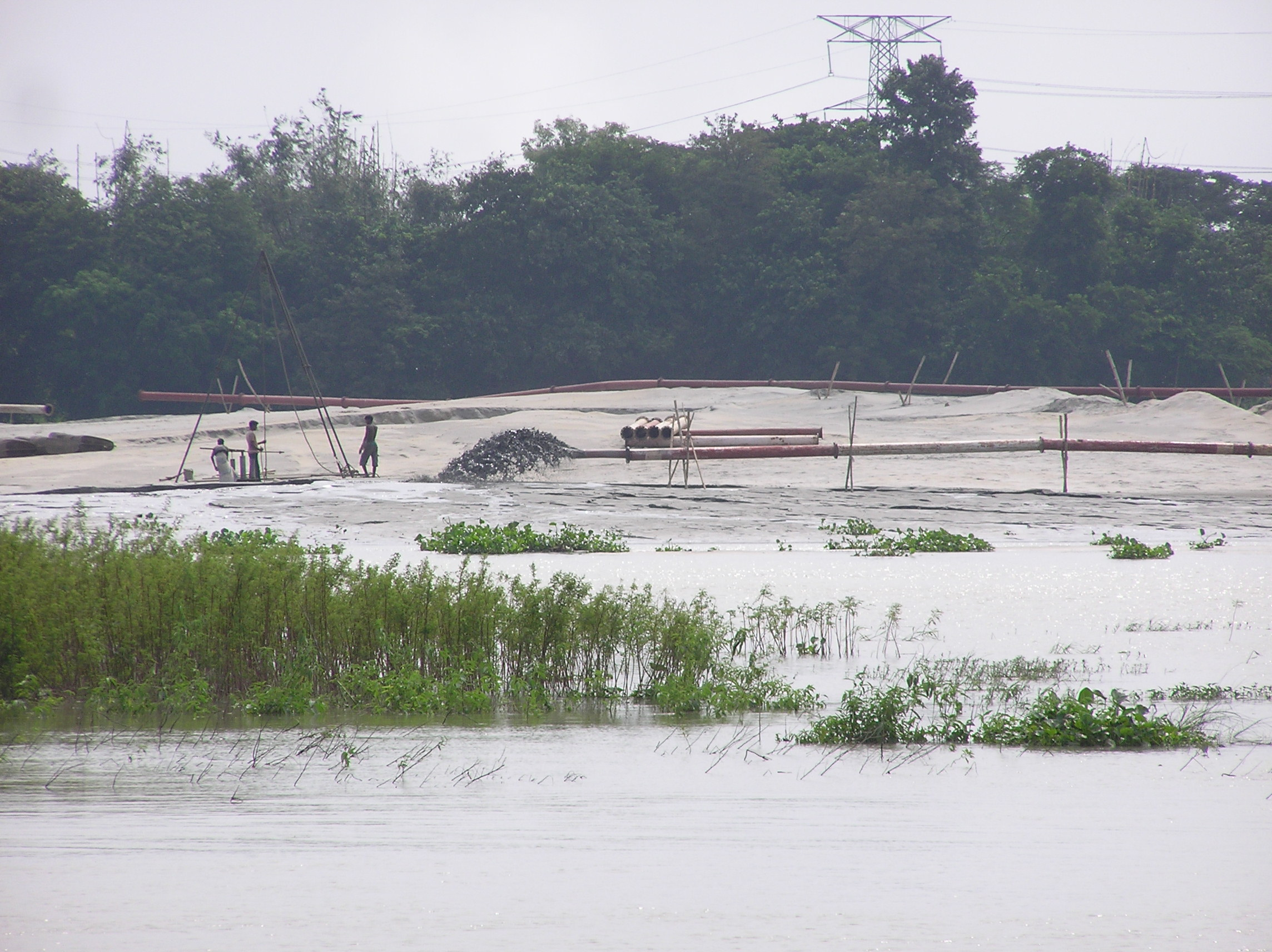
Land reclamation on the Buriganga river dredges sand and deposits it on the floodplain.

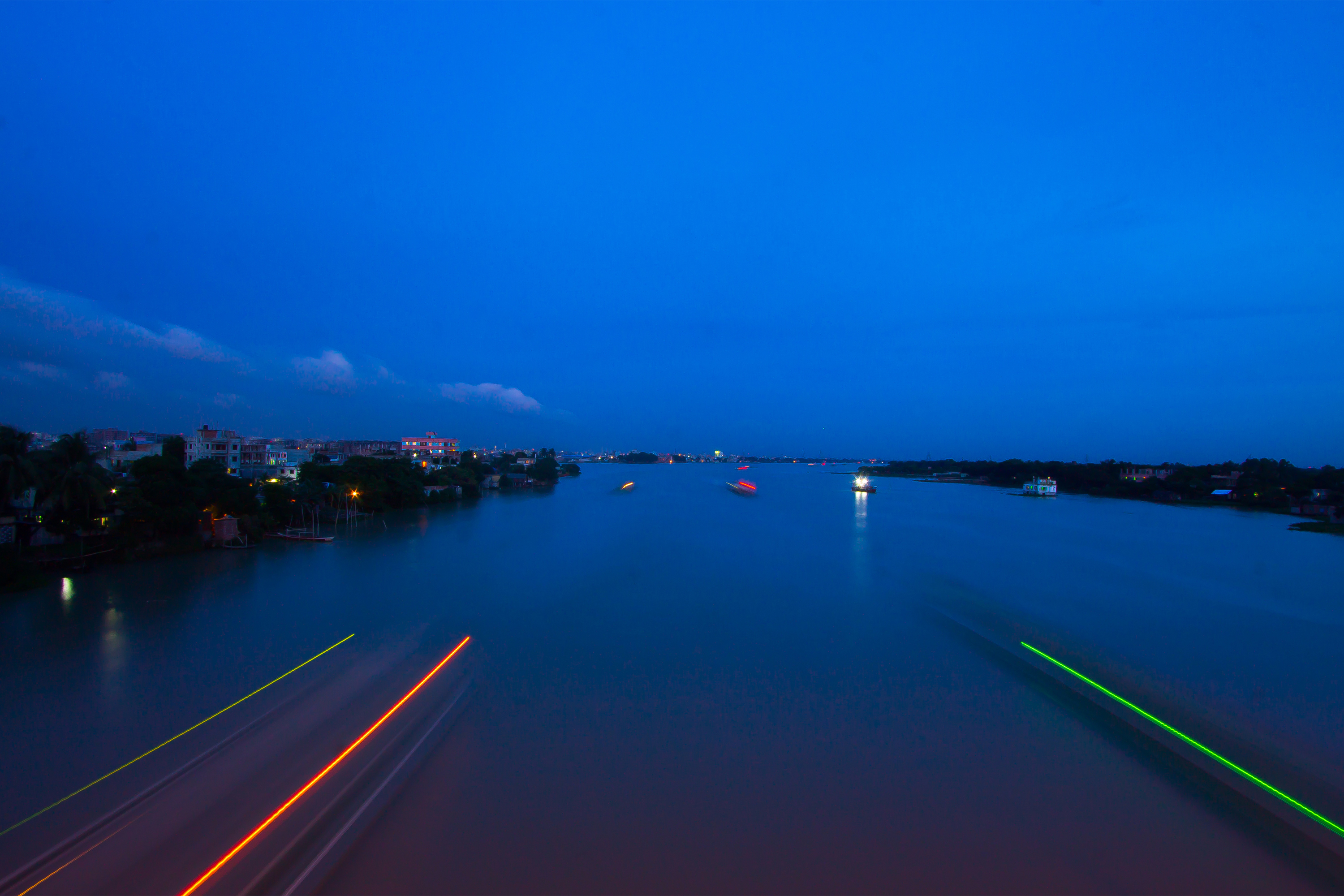
Evening of Buriganga River, Dhaka, Bangladesh

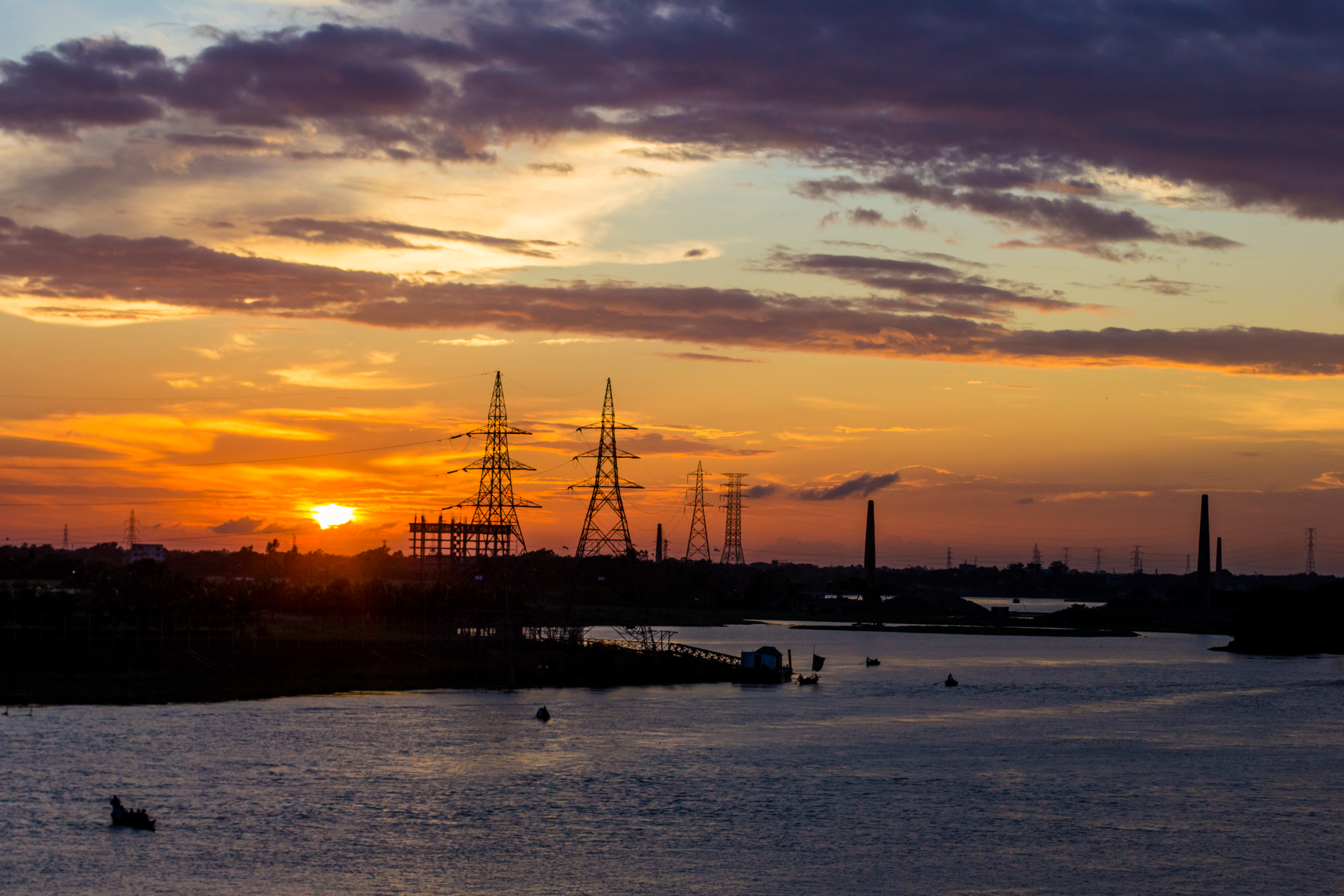
Sunset of Buriganga River

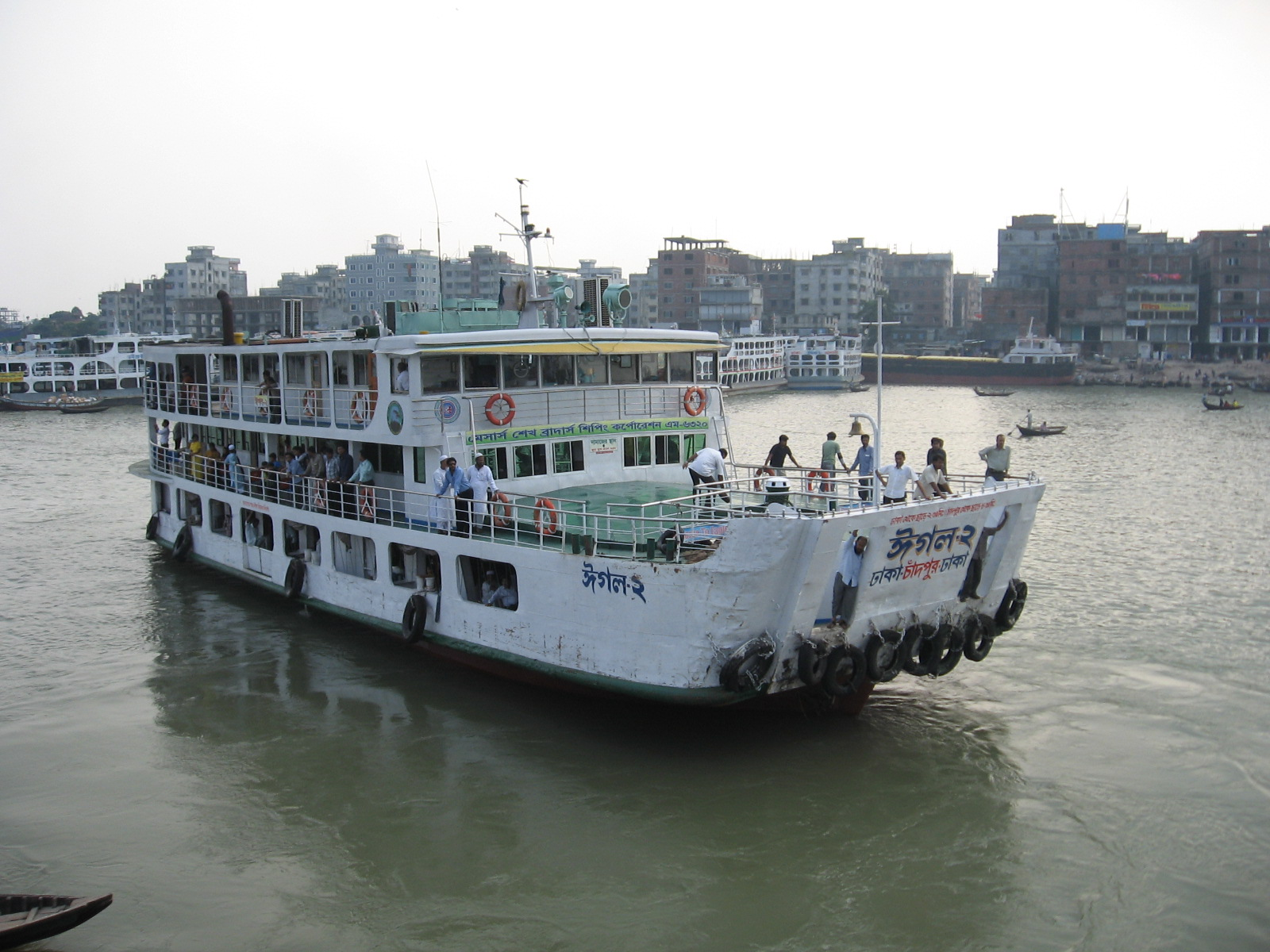
Launch

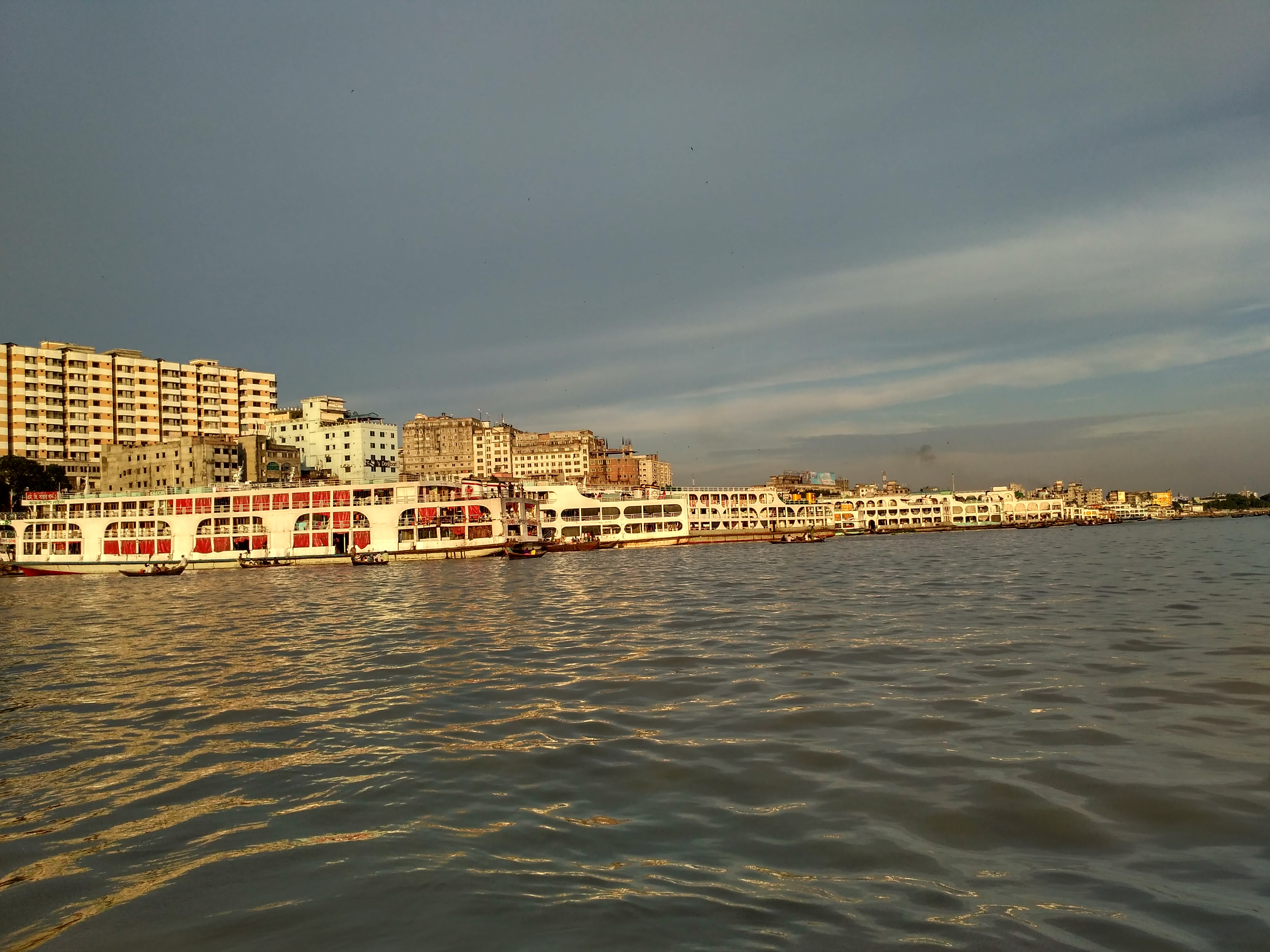
View of the Buriganga river at Sadarghat area with some launches
