= Dhaka South City Corporation =

Local governing body of Dhaka South, Bangladesh

Coordinates: 23.7239°N 90.4085°E

Dhaka South City Corporation ঢাকা দক্ষিণ সিটি কর্পোরেশন
- Emblem of the Dhaka South City Corporation

Type
- Type: City Corporation

History
- Founded: 1 December 2011; 14 years ago
- Preceded by: Dhaka City Corporation
- New session started: 19 August 2024

Leadership
- Mayor: Vacant since 19 August 2024
- Administrator: Md. Shahjahan Miah since 13 February 2025
- Deputy Mayor: Vacant since 7 July 2020
- Chief Executive Officer: Md. Mizanur Rahman since 4 December 2022

Structure
- Seats: Vacant seats 100 councillors
- Length of term: Up to five years

Elections
- Voting system: First past the post
- First election: 30 April 2015
- Last election: 1 February 2020
- Next election: TBD

Meeting place
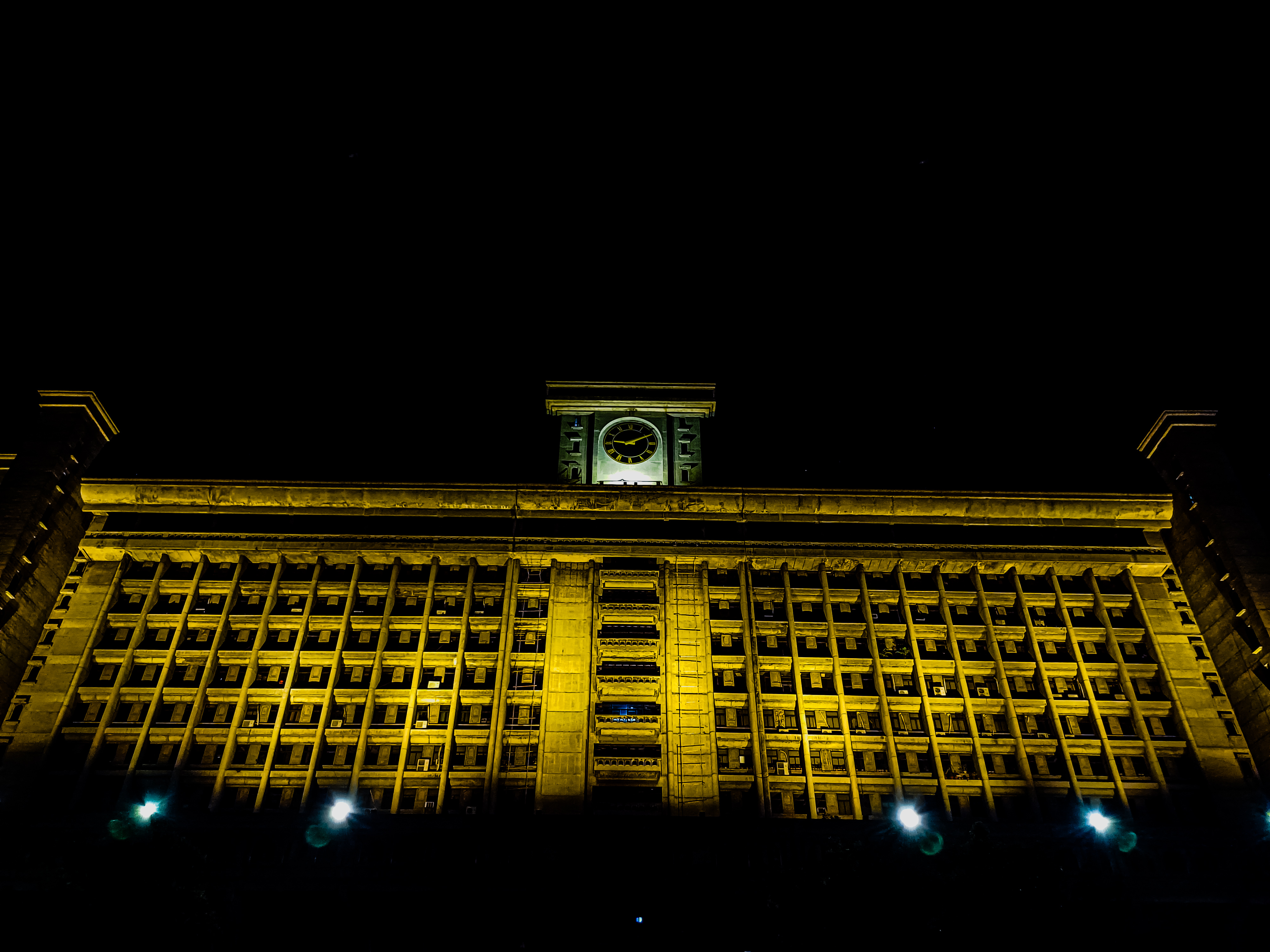
- Nagar Bhaban, Dhaka

Website
- dscc.gov.bd

Dhaka South City Corporation (Bengali: ঢাকা দক্ষিণ সিটি কর্পোরেশন: in short-DSCC), is a local governing body that manages all civic services in the southern part of Dhaka, the capital of Bangladesh. The DSCC government is elected by popular vote every five years. It is headed by a mayor, who presides over more than 100 councillors. The city corporation operates under the provisions of The City Corporation Act, 2009.

Dhaka South City Corporation is one of the two municipal corporations in Dhaka created when the former Dhaka City Corporation (first declared in 1864) was divided into two by the Local Government (City Corporation) Amendment Bill 2011 on 29 November 2011, passed in the Parliament of Bangladesh, following the President's approval. Dhaka South has a long history, including that of European arrival and colonization. The area was initially 45 km2, but expanded in 2017 to 109.2 km2 and Bangladesh Bureau of Statistics (BBS) published Population and Housing Census 2022 count at 4,305,063 giving the city a density of 39,409 people per km2.

Dhaka South was the center of the events which eventually led to the Bangladesh War of Independence.

There are plans of expanding the boundary of Dhaka South City Corporation to integrate parts of Keraniganj into Dhaka.

== History ==
The Local Government (City Corporation) Amendment Act 2011 divided Dhaka City Corporation into Dhaka South City Corporation (DSCC) and Dhaka North City Corporation (DNCC) on 29 November 2011. The government appointed Md. Khalilur Rahman (additional Secretary) as the administrator of DSCC.

According to the existing law, the executive power of the Dhaka South City Corporation vests in and is exercised by the mayor/administrator. The Corporation constitutes several standing committees and other committees to monitor and guide the diversified activities of the organization. The mayor/administrator is assisted by the chief executive officer, who in turn, is assisted by the secretary, the heads of departments and zonal executive officers.

On 9 May 2016, the government approved the expansion of Dhaka South City Corporation's jurisdiction to encompass eight unions: Shyampur, Dania, Matuail, Sarulia, Demra, Manda, Dakshingaon and Nasirabad. This extension increased the area of the city corporation to 109 square kilometres (42 sq mi).

== Demographics ==
Religions in Dhaka South City Corporation (2022)
| Religion | Percent |
| Islam | 95.27% |
| Hinduism | 4.51% |
| Christianity | 0.10% |
| Other or not stated | 0.12% |

According to the 2022 Census of Bangladesh, DSCC had 43,05,063 population living in 11,04,703 households. Among them, 41,01,482 were Muslims, 1,94,311 were Hindus, 4,481 were Christians, 4,438 were Buddhists and 351 were Others, including Tribal faiths. There were 3,784 ethnic populations including males and females. DSCC had a sex ratio of 119.03 indicating that there were 119 males for every 100 females.

== Administration ==
Dhaka South City Corporation consists of 75 wards covering the thanas of Paltan, Motijheel, Sabujbagh, Khilgaon, Mugda, Shahjahanpur, Shyampur, Jatrabari, Demra, Kadamtali, Gandaria, Wari, Ramna, New Market, Shahbag, Dhanmondi, Hazaribagh, Kalabagan, Kotwali, Sutrapur, Lalbagh, Bangsal, Chawkbazar, and Kamrangirchar.

== Ward and councillor list ==
| # | Ward | Councillor | Party |
|---|---|---|---|
| 1 | Ward No-1 | Vacant | TBD |
| 2 | Ward No-2 | Vacant | TBD |
| 3 | Ward No-3 | Vacant | TBD |
| 4 | Ward No-4 | Vacant | TBD |
| 5 | Ward No-5 | Vacant | TBD |
| 6 | Ward No-6 | Vacant | TBD |
| 7 | Ward No-7 | Vacant | TBD |
| 8 | Ward No-8 | Vacant | TBD |
| 9 | Ward No-9 | Vacant | TBD |
| 10 | Ward No-10 | Vacant | TBD |
| 11 | Ward No-11 | Vacant | TBD |
| 12 | Ward No-12 | Vacant | TBD |
| 13 | Ward No-13 | Vacant | TBD |
| 14 | Ward No-14 | Vacant | TBD |
| 15 | Ward No-15 | Vacant | TBD |
| 16 | Ward No-16 | Vacant | TBD |
| 17 | Ward No-17 | Vacant | TBD |
| 18 | Ward No-18 | Vacant | TBD |
| 19 | Ward No-19 | Vacant | TBD |
| 20 | Ward No-20 | Vacant | TBD |
| 21 | Ward No-21 | Vacant | TBD |
| 22 | Ward No-22 | Vacant | TBD |
| 23 | Ward No-23 | Vacant | TBD |
| 24 | Ward No-24 | Vacant | TBD |
| 25 | Ward No-25 | Vacant | TBD |
| 26 | Ward No-26 | Vacant | TBD |
| 27 | Ward No-27 | Vacant | TBD |
| 28 | Ward No-28 | Vacant | TBD |
| 29 | Ward No-29 | Vacant | TBD |
| 30 | Ward No-30 | Vacant | TBD |
| 31 | Ward No-31 | Vacant | TBD |
| 32 | Ward No-32 | Vacant | TBD |
| 33 | Ward No-33 | Vacant | TBD |
| 34 | Ward No-34 | Vacant | TBD |
| 35 | Ward No-35 | Vacant | TBD |
| 36 | Ward No-36 | Vacant | TBD |
| 37 | Ward No-37 | Vacant | TBD |
| 38 | Ward No-38 | Vacant | TBD |
| 39 | Ward No-39 | Vacant | TBD |
| 40 | Ward No-40 | Vacant | TBD |
| 41 | Ward No-41 | Vacant | TBD |
| 42 | Ward No-42 | Vacant | TBD |
| 43 | Ward No-43 | Vacant | TBD |
| 44 | Ward No-44 | Vacant | TBD |
| 45 | Ward No-45 | Vacant | TBD |
| 46 | Ward No-46 | Vacant | TBD |
| 47 | Ward No-47 | Vacant | TBD |
| 48 | Ward No-48 | Vacant | TBD |
| 49 | Ward No-49 | Vacant | TBD |
| 50 | Ward No-50 | Vacant | TBD |
| 51 | Ward No-51 | Vacant | TBD |
| 52 | Ward No-52 | Vacant | TBD |
| 53 | Ward No-53 | Vacant | TBD |
| 54 | Ward No-54 | Vacant | TBD |
| 55 | Ward No-55 | Vacant | TBD |
| 56 | Ward No-56 | Vacant | TBD |
| 57 | Ward No-57 | Vacant | TBD |
| 58 | Ward No-58 | Vacant | TBD |
| 59 | Ward No-59 | Vacant | TBD |
| 60 | Ward No-60 | Vacant | TBD |
| 61 | Ward No-61 | Vacant | TBD |
| 62 | Ward No-62 | Vacant | TBD |
| 63 | Ward No-63 | Vacant | TBD |
| 64 | Ward No-64 | Vacant | TBD |
| 65 | Ward No-65 | Vacant | TBD |
| 66 | Ward No-66 | Vacant | TBD |
| 67 | Ward No-67 | Vacant | TBD |
| 68 | Ward No-68 | Vacant | TBD |
| 69 | Ward No-69 | Vacant | TBD |
| 70 | Ward No-70 | Vacant | TBD |
| 71 | Ward No-71 | Vacant | TBD |
| 72 | Ward No-72 | Vacant | TBD |
| 73 | Ward No-73 | Vacant | TBD |
| 74 | Ward No-74 | Vacant | TBD |
| 75 | Ward No-75 | Vacant | TBD |
Reserved Women's Councillor
| 76 | Reserved women's seat-1 | Vacant | TBD |
| 77 | Reserved women's seat-2 | Vacant | TBD |
| 78 | Reserved women's seat-3 | Vacant | TBD |
| 79 | Reserved women's seat-4 | Vacant | TBD |
| 80 | Reserved women's seat-5 | Vacant | TBD |
| 81 | Reserved women's seat-6 | Vacant | TBD |
| 82 | Reserved women's seat-7 | Vacant | TBD |
| 83 | Reserved women's seat-8 | Vacant | TBD |
| 84 | Reserved women's seat-9 | Vacant | TBD |
| 85 | Reserved women's seat-10 | Vacant | TBD |
| 86 | Reserved women's seat-11 | Vacant | TBD |
| 87 | Reserved women's seat-12 | Vacant | TBD |
| 88 | Reserved women's seat-13 | Vacant | TBD |
| 89 | Reserved women's seat-14 | Vacant | TBD |
| 90 | Reserved women's seat-15 | Vacant | TBD |
| 91 | Reserved women's seat-16 | Vacant | TBD |
| 92 | Reserved women's seat-17 | Vacant | TBD |
| 93 | Reserved women's seat-18 | Vacant | TBD |
| 94 | Reserved women's seat-19 | Vacant | TBD |
| 95 | Reserved women's seat-20 | Vacant | TBD |
| 96 | Reserved women's seat-21 | Vacant | TBD |
| 97 | Reserved women's seat-22 | Vacant | TBD |
| 98 | Reserved women's seat-23 | Vacant | TBD |
| 99 | Reserved women's seat-24 | Vacant | TBD |
| 100 | Reserved women's seat-25 | Vacant | TBD |

== Services ==
The DSCC Government is responsible for administering and providing basic infrastructure to the city.

| Departments | Services |
|---|---|
| Electricity | Maintenance of road lighting and street lamps. |
| Urban Planning and Development | Development and renovation of roads, drains, canals, bridges, culverts and footpaths etc. |
| Urban Planning and Development | Land development and city beautification. |
| Urban Planning and Development | Urban expansion and development of planned residential areas. |
| Engineering | Granting permission to cut roads for laying gas, water lines. |
| Engineering | Building Design Approval, Contractor Registration, Contractor Renewal, Land Demarcation Certificate. |
| Transportation and Communication | Urban transport system and de-congestion. |
| Transportation and Communication | City traffic control and parking management. |
| Transportation and Communication | Emergency transportation and storage of corpses. |
| Transportation and Communication | Construction and Management of Bus Terminals. |
| Transportation and Communication | Road roller hire, provision of ambulance for sick patients. |
| Waste Management and Cleaning | Solid waste management and street cleaning. |
| Waste Management and Cleaning | Clearing drains and eliminating waterlogging. |
| Waste Management and Cleaning | Mosquito eradication. |
| Health | Management of Matrisadan Hospital and General Hospital Charitable Hospital and Homeo Charitable Hospital |
| Health | Immunization of mothers and children, deworming and conduct of vitamin A+ campaign under EPI programme. |
| Health | Diploma in Midwifery Institute and Management of Health Technology. |
| Registrar | Registration of births/deaths and issuance of certificates. |
| Registrar | Issuance of nationality, inheritance and character certificates. |
| Education | Conducting Secondary and Higher Secondary Schools, Furkaniya Madrasas, Sanskrit Tolls and Kindergartens. |
| Education | Management of computer institutes and technical training institutes. |
| Education | Management of Adult Education and Teacher Training Centres. |
| Education | Conducting theater institutes for healthy development in cultural activities. |
| Water Supply and Sewerage | Water supply and sewerage in Dhaka South city under Dhaka WASA. |
| Revenue | New issue/renewal of trade license, change of name and change of ownership. |
| Revenue | Issuance of holding number, change of number, collection of holding tax and reduction of tax, cancellation of holding name etc. |
| Revenue | Allotment of shops owned by the Corporation, transfer of shops, allotment of market shops, lease of huts, maintenance of fixed assets of the Corporation. |
| Security and Law and Order | Coordinating with concerned authorities to ensure city security. |
| Security and Law and Order | Installing and monitoring CCTV cameras. |
| Magistracy | Settlement of cases through arbitration and appellate court proceedings. |
| Magistracy | Mobile court to conduct anti-adulteration campaign. |
| Housing and Public Works | Distribution of residential plots and flats to solve the city's housing crisis. |
| Social Welfare | Celebration of National Days, Annual Donations. |
| Social Welfare | Construction of children's parks to increase children's recreational facilities. |
| Environmental Protection | Controlling climate pollution and tackling the effects of climate change. |
| Environmental Protection | Greening and establishing urban gardens and planting trees. |

== Annual Budget ==
Dhaka South City Corporation (DSCC) has announced a ৳6760.74 crore (US$550 million) budget for fiscal year of 2024-25.

== List of mayors ==
The mayor of the South Dhaka is the chief executive of the Dhaka South City Corporation. The mayor's office administers all city services, public property, most public agencies, and enforces all city and state laws within Dhaka city.

According to the existing law, the executive power of the Dhaka South City Corporation vests in and is exercised by the mayor/administrator. The Corporation constitutes several standing committees and other committees to monitor and guide the diversified activities of the organization. The mayor/administrator is assisted by the chief executive officer, who in turn, is assisted by the secretary, the heads of departments and zonal executive officers.

- Acting Mayor and Administrator

| No. | Portrait | Name (Birth–Death) | Election | Term of office | | | Political party | Reference |
| No. | Portrait | Name (Birth–Death) | Election | Took office | Left office | Time in office | Political party | Reference |
|---|---|---|---|---|---|---|---|---|
| 1 | | Sayeed Khokon | 2015 | 5 May 2015 | 16 May 2020 | 5 years, 11 days | Bangladesh Awami League | |
| 2 | | Sheikh Fazle Noor Taposh | 2020 | 16 May 2020 | 19 August 2024 | 4 years, 95 days | Bangladesh Awami League | |
| – | | Dr. Ma. Sher Ali (Administrator) | – | 19 August 2024 | 13 February 2025 | 178 days | Independent | |
| – | | Md. Shahjahan Miah (Administrator) | – | 13 February 2025 | Incumbent | 1 year, 273 days | Independent | |

== Deputy mayor ==
The deputy mayor (also known as Panel mayor) is a second-ranking official of city corporation. 3 Panel mayors are appointed from the council member to assist the mayor through voting. The 1st panel mayor with the highest number of votes is appointed as deputy mayor or acting mayor. In the absence of the mayor, the deputy mayor controls all functions of the City Corporation. Other 2 Panel mayors also assist mayor and to oversee major offices within the executive branch of the DSCC.

| Serial No. | Post | Name |
|---|---|---|
| 01 | Panel Mayor 1 | Vacant |
| 02 | Panel Mayor 2 | Vacant |
| 03 | Panel Mayor 3 | Vacant |

== Elections ==
=== Election result 2020 ===
Dhaka South Mayoral Election 2020
| Party | Candidate | Votes | % | ±% |
|---|---|---|---|---|
| Bangladesh Awami League | Sheikh Fazle Noor Taposh | 4,24,595 | 60.76 | New |
| Bangladesh Nationalist Party | Ishraque Hossain | 2,36,512 | 33.84 | New |
| Islami Andolan Bangladesh | Abdur Rahman | 26,525 | 3.79 | New |
| Jatiya Party (Ershad) | Saifuddin Ahmen Milon | 5,593 | 0.80 | New |
| Bangladesh Congress | Akhtaruzzaman Alias Ayatullah | 2,421 | 0.34 | New |
| Majority | | 1,88,083 | - | - |
| Turnout | | 7,11,488 | - | - |
| Total Registered Voters | | 24,53,194 | - | |
| AL Hold | | Swing | | |

=== Election result 2015 ===
Dhaka South Mayoral Election 2015
| Party | Candidate | Votes | % |
|---|---|---|---|
| Bangladesh Awami League | Sayeed Khokon | 5,35,296 | 59.12 |
| Bangladesh Nationalist Party | Mirza Abbas | 2,94,291 | 32.50 |
| Islami Andolan Bangladesh | Abdur Rahman | 14,784 | 1.63 |
| Jatiya Party (Ershad) | Saifuddin Ahmen Milon | 4,519 | 0.50 |
| Invalid | | 40,130 | 4.43 |
| Majority | | 2,41,005 | 26.62 |
| Turnout | | 9,05,484 | 48.40 |
| Total Registered | | 18,70,778 | |
| AL Gain (New City) | | | |

== See also ==
- Upazilas of Bangladesh
- Districts of Bangladesh
- Divisions of Bangladesh
- List of city corporations in Bangladesh
- Dhaka North City Corporation
- Administrative geography of Bangladesh
