= Mayor of South Dhaka =

- Incumbent; Md. Abdus Salam (Administrator) since 24 February 2026
- Dhaka South City Corporation
- Style: Honourable (formal)
- Type: Council Leader
- Member of: Dhaka South City Corporation
- Seat: Nagar Bhaban, Dhaka
- Appointer: Electorate of South Dhaka
- Term length: Five years, renewable
- Constituting instrument: The City Corporation act, 2009
- Precursor: Mayor of Dhaka
- Inaugural holder: Sayeed Khokon
- Formation: 1 December 2011; 14 years ago
- Salary: ৳150000 (US$1,200) per month (incl. allowances)
- Website: www.dscc.gov.bd

The Mayor of South Dhaka is the chief elected executive of the Dhaka South City Corporation. The Mayor's office oversees civic services, manages public properties, and coordinates the functions of various government agencies in the southern part of Dhaka. In addition, the Mayor is responsible for enforcing city corporation regulations and state laws, thereby ensuring good governance and the development of the city.

The Mayor's office is located in Nagar Bhaban; it has jurisdiction over all 75 wards of Dhaka South City.

== List of officeholders ==
Political parties

- Bangladesh Awami League
- Bangladesh Nationalist Party

Other factions

- Independent

Status

- Acting Mayor and Administrator

No.	Portrait	Officeholder (birth–death)	Election	Term of office			Designation	Political party	Reference
No.	Portrait	Officeholder (birth–death)	Election	From	To	Period	Designation	Political party	Reference
1		Sayeed Khokon	2015	5 May 2015	16 May 2020	5 years, 11 days	Mayor	Bangladesh Awami League	
2		Sheikh Fazle Noor Taposh	2020	16 May 2020	19 August 2024	4 years, 95 days	Mayor	Bangladesh Awami League	
–		Dr. Ma. Sher Ali	–	19 August 2024	13 February 2025	178 days	Administrator	Independent	
–		Md. Shahjahan Miah	–	13 February 2025	3 November 2025	263 days	Administrator	Independent	
–		Mohammed Mahmudul Hassan	–	3 November 2025	23 February 2026	112 days	Administrator	Independent	
–		Md. Abdus Salam	–	24 February 2026	Incumbent	231 days	Administrator	Bangladesh Nationalist Party	

== Elections ==
=== Election result 2020 ===
Dhaka South Mayoral Election 2020
Party	Candidate	Votes	%	±%
Bangladesh Awami League	Sheikh Fazle Noor Taposh	424,595	60.76	+1.64
Bangladesh Nationalist Party	Ishraque Hossain	236,512	33.84	+1.34
Islami Andolan Bangladesh	Abdur Rahman	26,525	3.79	+2.16
Jatiya Party (Ershad)	Saifuddin Ahmen Milon	5,593	0.80	+0.30
Bangladesh Congress	Akhtaruzzaman Alias Ayatullah	2,421	0.34	New
Majority		188,083	26.92	+0.30
Turnout		711,488	28.99	−19.41
Total Registered Voters		2,453,194	-	-
AL Hold		Swing		

=== Election result 2015 ===
Dhaka South Mayoral Election 2015
Party	Candidate	Votes	%	±%
Bangladesh Awami League	Sayeed Khokon	535,296	59.12	New
Bangladesh Nationalist Party	Mirza Abbas	294,291	32.50	New
Islami Andolan Bangladesh	Abdur Rahman	14,784	1.63	New
Jatiya Party (Ershad)	Saifuddin Ahmen Milon	4,519	0.50	New
Invalid		40,130	4.43	
Majority		241,005	26.62	
Turnout		905,484	48.40	
Total Registered		1,870,778		
AL Gain (New City)				
