= Dhaka City Corporation =

Former city corporation of Bangladesh

Coordinates: 23.7233°N 90.4272°E

Dhaka City Corporation ঢাকা সিটি কর্পোরেশন

Type
- Type: City Corporation

History
- Founded: 1 August 1864
- Disbanded: 1 December 2011; 14 years ago
- Succeeded by: Dhaka South City Corporation; Dhaka North City Corporation
- Seats: 129 (54 seats of DNCC and 75 seats of DSCC)

Elections
- Voting system: First past the post
- First election: 12 March 1994
- Last election: 25 April 2002

Meeting place
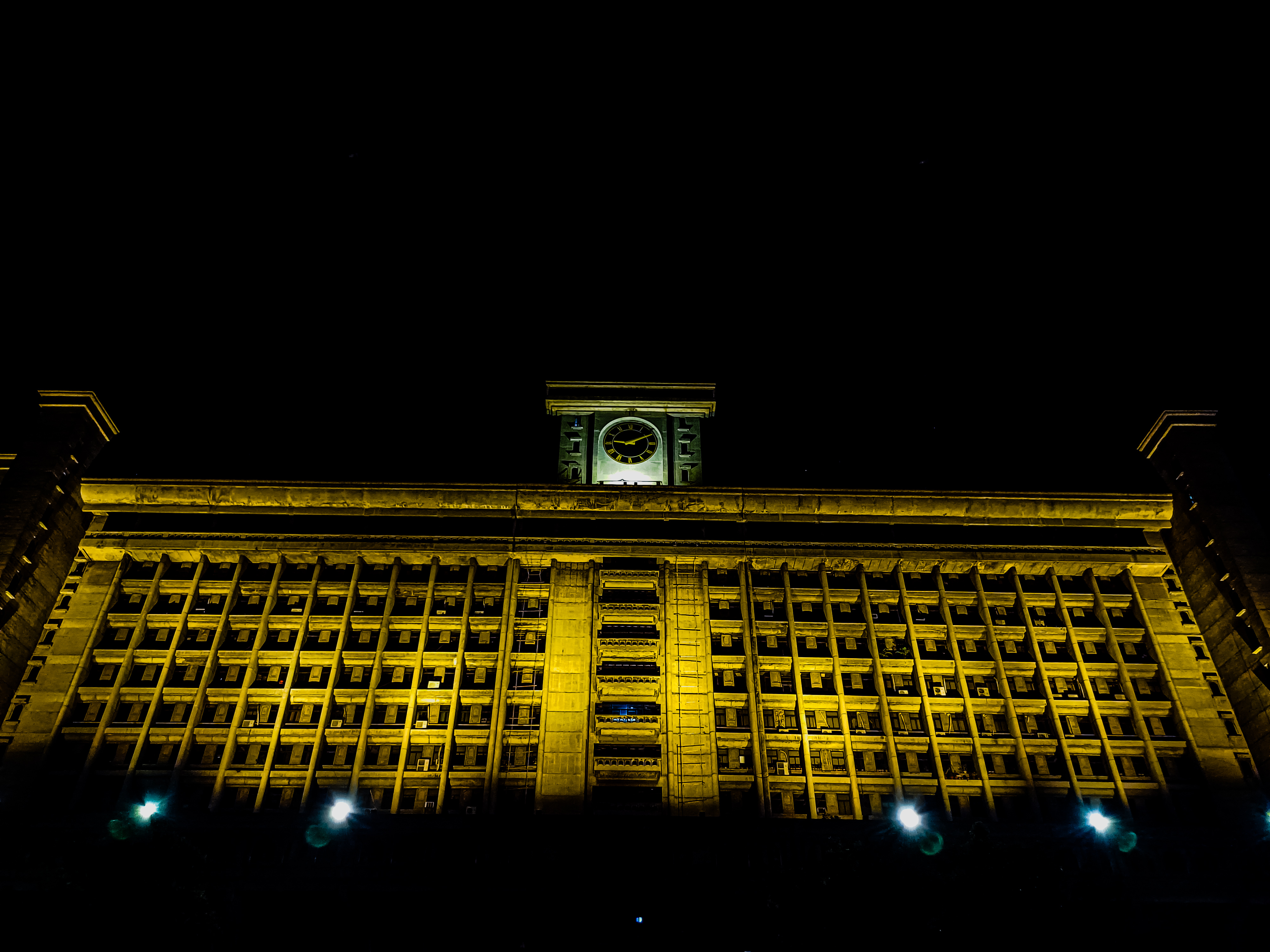
- Nagar Bhaban, Dhaka

Dhaka City Corporation (DCC) was the former self-governing corporation that was entrusted with the task of administering the municipal affairs of Dhaka, the Bangladeshi capital. The incorporated area was divided into several wards. Each ward has an elected ward commissioner. The mayor of the city was elected by popular vote every five years, although the last mayoral election took place in 2002. The corporation was dissolved by the Local Government (City Corporation) Amendment Bill 2011 on 29 November, passed in the Parliament of Bangladesh, and formally ceased to exist on 1 December 2011, following the President's approval, making way for a Dhaka North and a Dhaka South city corporations.

== History ==
Dacca Municipality, the predecessor of the city corporation, was established on 1 August 1864. The first elected chairman was Ananda Chandra Roy. and first elected Vice-Chairman was Mr. Khawaja Amirullah. Prior to that, a Committee for the improvement of Dacca was formed in 1823. The Act of 1884 added the provision of elected representatives called commissioners. In 1978, it gained status as Dhaka Municipality Corporation, and in 1990, it became Dhaka City Corporation. It is divided into 90 wards. In 1982, two adjoining municipalities, Mirpur and Gulshan, were merged with Dhaka Municipality. The Administrator of Dhaka Municipal Corporation, after Bangladesh was formed was Lt. Col. Hesamuddin Ahmed psc (Retd). In 1983, it was renamed as Dhaka Municipal Corporation. Finally, in 1990, it was renamed as Dhaka City Corporation. Until 1994, mayors were appointed by the government. The first elected mayor by popular vote took office in 1994, late Mayor Mohammad Hanif was the first elected Mayor of Dhaka. The Local Govt. (City Corporation) Act 2009, (Amendment-2011), Dhaka City Corporation has divided as Dhaka South City Corporation (DSCC) and Dhaka North City Corporation (DNCC). In April 2002, Mr. Sadeque Hossain Khoka was elected Mayor of Dhaka City Corporation and he was the last mayor of Dhaka City Corporation. Annisul Huq was elected mayor of the Dhaka North City Corporation in April 2015.

== List of officeholders ==
Political parties

- Bangladesh Nationalist Party
- Jatiya Party (Ershad)
- Bangladesh Awami League

No.	Portrait	Officeholder (birth–death)	Election	Term of office			Designation	Political party
No.	Portrait	Officeholder (birth–death)	Election	From	To	Period	Designation	Political party
1		Abul Hasnat (1940–2022)	–	31 October 1977	9 May 1982	4 years, 221 days	Mayor	Bangladesh Nationalist Party
Post vacant (1982 – 1986)
2		Mohammad Abdul Malek (1935–2000)	–	20 October 1986	9 October 1989	2 years, 354 days	Mayor	Jatiya Party (Ershad)
3		Naziur Rahman Manzur (1948–2008)	–	9 October 1989	2 December 1990	1 year, 54 days	Mayor	Jatiya Party (Ershad)
4		Abul Hasnat (1940–2022)	–	3 December 1990	12 December 1990	9 days	Mayor	Bangladesh Nationalist Party
5		Mirza Abbas	–	13 December 1990	11 March 1994	3 years, 88 days	Mayor	Bangladesh Nationalist Party
6		Mohammad Hanif (1944–2006)	1994	12 March 1994	4 April 2002	8 years, 23 days	Mayor	Bangladesh Awami League
7		Sadeque Hossain Khoka (1952–2019)	2002	25 April 2002	29 November 2011	9 years, 218 days	Mayor	Bangladesh Nationalist Party
Post abolished (2 new mayor post have been formed)

== Bifurcation ==
The Awami League government on 29 November 2011 dissolved the Dhaka City Corporation by the Local Government (City Corporation) Amendment Bill 2011 passed by the Parliament of Bangladesh after being placed in the Parliament on 23 November. The city corporation will be split into two corporations, North and South, with the southern wing holding more territory than the north. Each corporation will be a self-governing entity, thus giving the city of Dhaka two mayors. The government holds that bifurcation would ensure better quality of civic services to the denizens of the city.

=== Dhaka North City Corporation ===
Dhaka North City Corporation consists of 54 wards covering the thanas of Mirpur, Mohammadpur, Sher-e-Bangla Nagar, Pallabi, Adabor, Kafrul, Dhaka Cantonment, Tejgaon, Gulshan, Rampura, Banani, Bimanbandar, Khilkhet, Vatara, Badda, Uttara & some others. The area of Dhaka north city corporation is 196.22 square km. The current administrator of Dhaka North City Corporation is Mohammad Ejaz.

Zone-1
Ward No.	Ward Area Name
1	Uttara Model Town
17	Kuril, Khilkhet, Nikunjo

Zone-2
Ward No.	Ward Area Name
2	Mirpur-12, Mirpur Ceramic
3	Mirpur-10
4	Mirpur-14, Bysthtek
5	Mirpur-11, Palashnagar, Bawneabad Area
6	Mirpur-6 & 7, Pallabi
7	Mirpur-2, Rupnagar, Govt. Housing Estate
8	Mirpur-1, Box Nagar, Zoo and Botanical Garden
15	Vasantek, Matikata, Manikdey, Barontek

Zone-3
Ward No.	Ward Area Name
18	Baridhara, Shahzadpur
19	Gulshan, Banani
20	Mohakhali, Niketan
21	Badda
22	East Rampura, Ulon, West Haji Para
23	Khilgaon B Zone, Purbo Haji Para, Chowdhury Para
24	Tejgaon I/A, Kunipara
25	Azrat Para, Rasulbagh, Tejgaon
35	Boro Moghbazar, Eskaton
36	Neyatola

Zone-4
Ward No.	Ward Area Name
9	Golartek, Baghbari, Gabtoli Bus Terminal
10	Gabtoli, Mirpur Colony, Darus Salam
11	Paik Para
12	Ahmed Nagar
13	Monipur, Parerbagh
14	Kazipara, Shewrapara, Senpara-parbata
16	Ibrahimpur, Kafrul

Zone-5
Ward No.	Ward Area Name
26	Kawran Bazar
27	Rajabazar, Monipuripara, Indra Road
28	Agargaon, Taltola Staff Quarter
29	Mohammadpur
30	Shyamoli Ring Road, Adabor, Shekhertek
31	Mohammadpur Azam Road, Zakir Hossain Road, Kazi Nazrul Islam Road
34	Jafrabad, Sultanganj, Rayer Bazar, Bibir Bazar, Madhu Bazar

=== Dhaka South City Corporation ===
Dhaka South City Corporation consists of 75 wards covering the thanas of Paltan, Motijheel, Jatrabari, Kotwali, Sutrapur, Bangsal, Wari, Ramna, Gendaria, Chowkbazar, Lalbagh, Hazaribagh, Dhanmondi, Shahbagh, New Market, Khilgaon, Kamrangirchar & some others. The area of Dhaka south city corporation is 109.24 square km.The current administrator of Dhaka South City Corporation is MD. Shahjahan Miah

Zone-1
Ward No.	Ward Area Name
15	
16	
17	
18	
19	
20	
21	

Zone-2
Ward No.	Ward Area Name
1	
2	
3	
4	
5	
6	
7	
8	
9	
10	
11	
12	
13	

Zone-3
Ward No.	Ward Area Name
14	
22	
23	
24	
25	
26	
27	
28	
29	
55	
56	
57	

Zone-4
Ward No.	Ward Area Name
30	
31	
32	
33	
34	
35	
36	
37	
38	
42	
43	

Zone-5
Ward No.	Ward Area Name
7	
39	
40	
41	
44	
45	
46	
47	
48	
49	
50	
51	
52	
53	
54	

Zone-6
Ward No.	Ward Area Name
70	
74	
75	

Zone-7
Ward No.	Ward Area Name
71	
72	
73	

Zone-8
Ward No.	Ward Area Name
66	
67	
68	
69	

Zone-9
Ward No.	Ward Area Name
62	North Kutubkhali, South Kazla, South Kazla(Noyanogon), Chontek, Sheikhdi, Gobindopur, North Rayerbagh.
63	Kazlar par, Vangapress, Kazirgaon, Matuail, Majhpara, Matuail uttorpara, Matuail sharifpara,
64	Konapara, Puraton airpara, IR Tubes factory, Dharmik Para, City mills, Mallik Para, Para Dogar, New Para
65	Momenbagh, Adorshobagh, Rohmotpur, Modhubagh, Muslimnagar, Mogolnogor, Khuriyapara, Keramipaa Dokkshinpara, Vuiyabari, Khan bari, Rayerbagh Hashem Road, Rayerbari Khanka, Matuail Medical, Saddam Market, Tushardhaa, Giridhara, South part of Bisshoroad

Zone-10
Ward No.	Ward Area Name
58	
59	
60	
61	

== Opposition to the bifurcation ==
The split was condemned by opposition party BNP, some citizens, and even by members of the incumbent government. Incumbent mayor Khoka (who lost his seat) of BNP promised that he would not contest the next city elections if the government would let the city not be split. He also promised that the split will be scrapped once BNP returns to power. Incumbent councillors as well as staff of the former City Corporation went on strike if the bill was passed. Protesting staff of the corporation were met with an armed police force.

There were calls by some for a referendum before the split was made.

Since only the corporations are being split without a split in service providing agencies, this may give rise to a messy situation with a bureaucratic bottleneck, causing co-ordination failure amongst the services provided to the citizens. Some have suggested that the creation of two corporations will result in a greater payment in taxpaying money for administrative expenses, without a guarantee of improvement in civic services.

Since the Constitution of Bangladesh names Dhaka as the capital of Bangladesh, some legal experts believe that the law may be challenged as a violation of the constitution. To this end, Khoka filed a writ petition at the High Court challenging the new law after it was passed; the court, in turn, asked the government to show cause as to why the split was not illegal or unconstitutional.
