= Kamrangirchar Thana =

Thana in Dhaka South City Corporation, Bangladesh

Kamrangirchar Thana কামরাঙ্গীরচর থানা
- Thana
- Interactive map of Kamrangirchar Thana
- Coordinates: 23.71799°N 90.36780°E
- Country: Bangladesh
- Division: Dhaka Division
- District: Dhaka District
- Established as a thana: 1998

Area
  - Total: 3.63 km^{2} (1.40 sq mi)
- Elevation: 23 m (75 ft)

Population (2022)
  - Total: 372,287
  - Density: 25,785/km^{2} (66,780/sq mi)
- Time zone: UTC+6 (BST)
- Postal code: 1211
- Area code: 02

Kamrangirchar (Bengali: কামরাঙ্গীরচর, lit. 'shoal of Kamrangi') is a thana (police precinct) in Dhaka, Bangladesh. The thana is under the jurisdiction of Dhaka South City Corporation wards 55, 56, and 57.

Kamrangirchar was a disconnected landmass until 1991. The thana was established in 1998 and incorporated into the city corporation in 2013. A long-term plan to transform the area into a business district is underway.

== Geography ==
Kamrangirchar is bounded by Hazaribagh Thana and Lalbagh Thana on the north, Lalbagh Thana and Chawkbazar Thana on the east and Keraniganj Upazila on the south and west. Its total area is 3.63 km^{2} (1.40 sq mi).

== History ==
The exact origin of the name Kamrangirchar is uncertain. According to historian Nazir Hossain, the area was named after a beautiful woman named Kamrangi, who drowned while crossing the Buriganga. He also suggests that British surveyors named the area after seeing Kamranga chilli peppers being cultivated there. Another legend proposes that the name evolved from Kamaner Char (lit. 'shoal of the cannon'), referring to a Mughal-era cannon.

Sources suggest that Kamrangirchar may have first been settled in the 17th century. In 1912, the government acquired the land from Bhawal Raja, who owned most of it. Until 1991, Kamrangirchar was an

island in the Buriganga, completely disconnected from the mainland of Dhaka, when it was first connected to Lalbagh through the construction of the 'Hakkul Ebad Iron Bridge'.

In 1998, Kamrangirchar Thana was formed consisting parts of Lalbagh Thana. In 2013, Kamrangirchar was brought under the jurisdiction of wards 55, 56, and 57 of Dhaka South City Corporation, following the dissolution of Sultanganj Union.

In November 2021, mayor of Dhaka South Sheikh Fazle Noor Taposh announced long-term plans to build a modern central business district in Kamrangirchar. In March 2024, residents held a rally protesting the plan, which would require acquisition of 1,200 acres (4.9 km^{2}) and eviction of almost two million people.

== Demographics ==
According to 2011 Census of Bangladesh, Kamrangirchar Thana has a population of 93,601 with average household size of 4.3 members, and an average literacy rate of 57.6% vs national average of 51.8% literacy.

Religions in Kamrangichar Thana (2022)
Religion	Percent
Islam	99.29%
Hinduism	0.68%
Other or not stated	0.03%

According to the 2022 Bangladeshi census, Kamrangichar Thana had 97,564 households and a population of 372,302. 9.39% of the population were under 5 years of age. Kamrangichar had a literacy rate (age 7 and over) of 72.92%: 73.63% for males and 72.09% for females, and a sex ratio of 115.40 males for every 100 females.

The religious breakdown was Muslim 99.46% (93,095), Hindu 0.52% (491), Christian 0.01% (11), Buddhist 0.00% (4), and others 0.00% (00).

A 2006 survey of slums in Bangladesh found that the single largest concentration of slums in the Dhaka Metropolitan Area was in Kamrangirchar, and reported that of the approx. 300,000 people living there, 265,000 are slum dwellers.

== See also ==
- Upazilas of Bangladesh
- Districts of Bangladesh
- Divisions of Bangladesh
