= 2015 Dhaka South City Corporation election =

Mayoral election in Bangladesh

- 30 April 2015
- Registered: 1,870,778
- Turnout: 48.40%
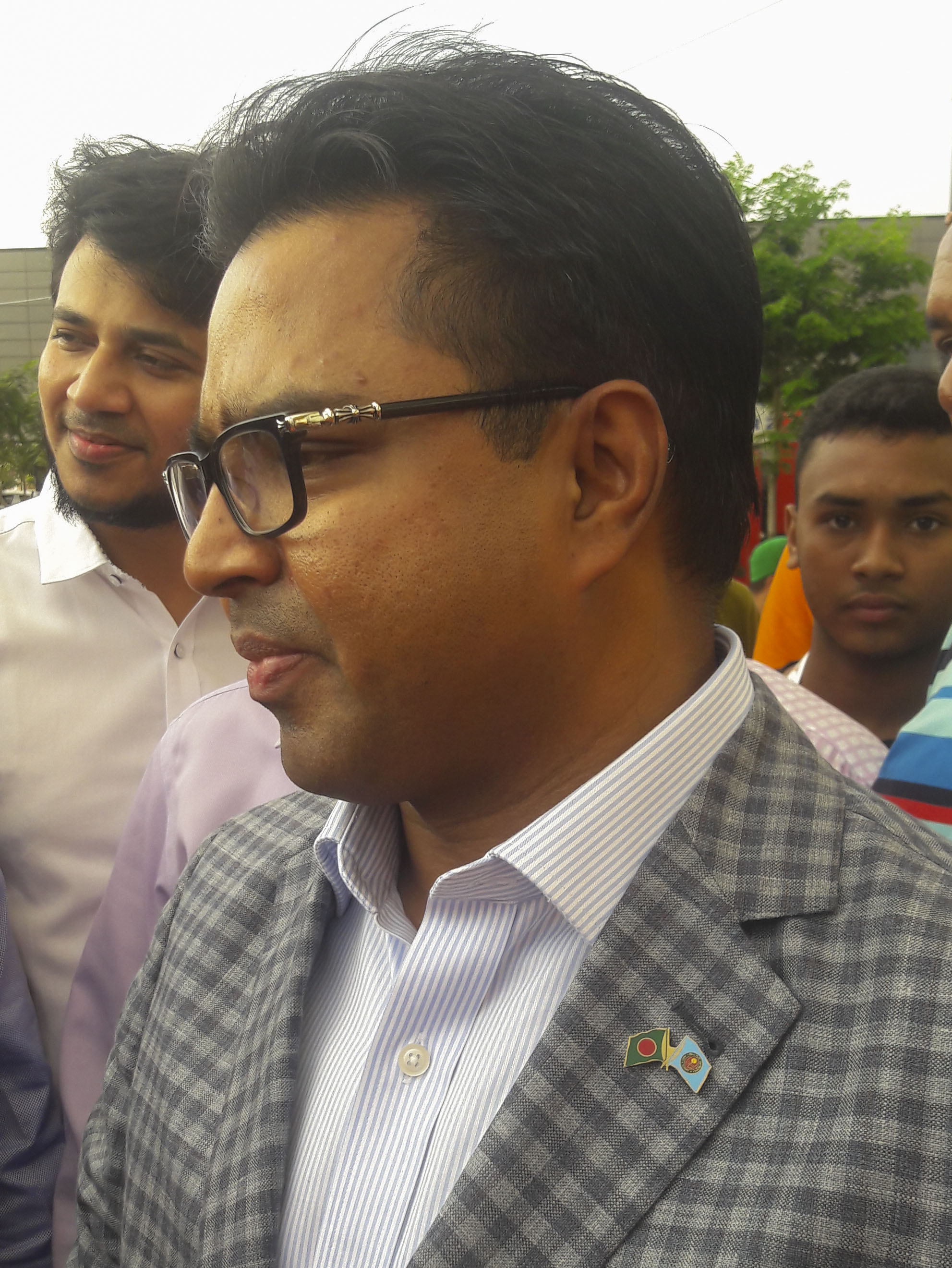

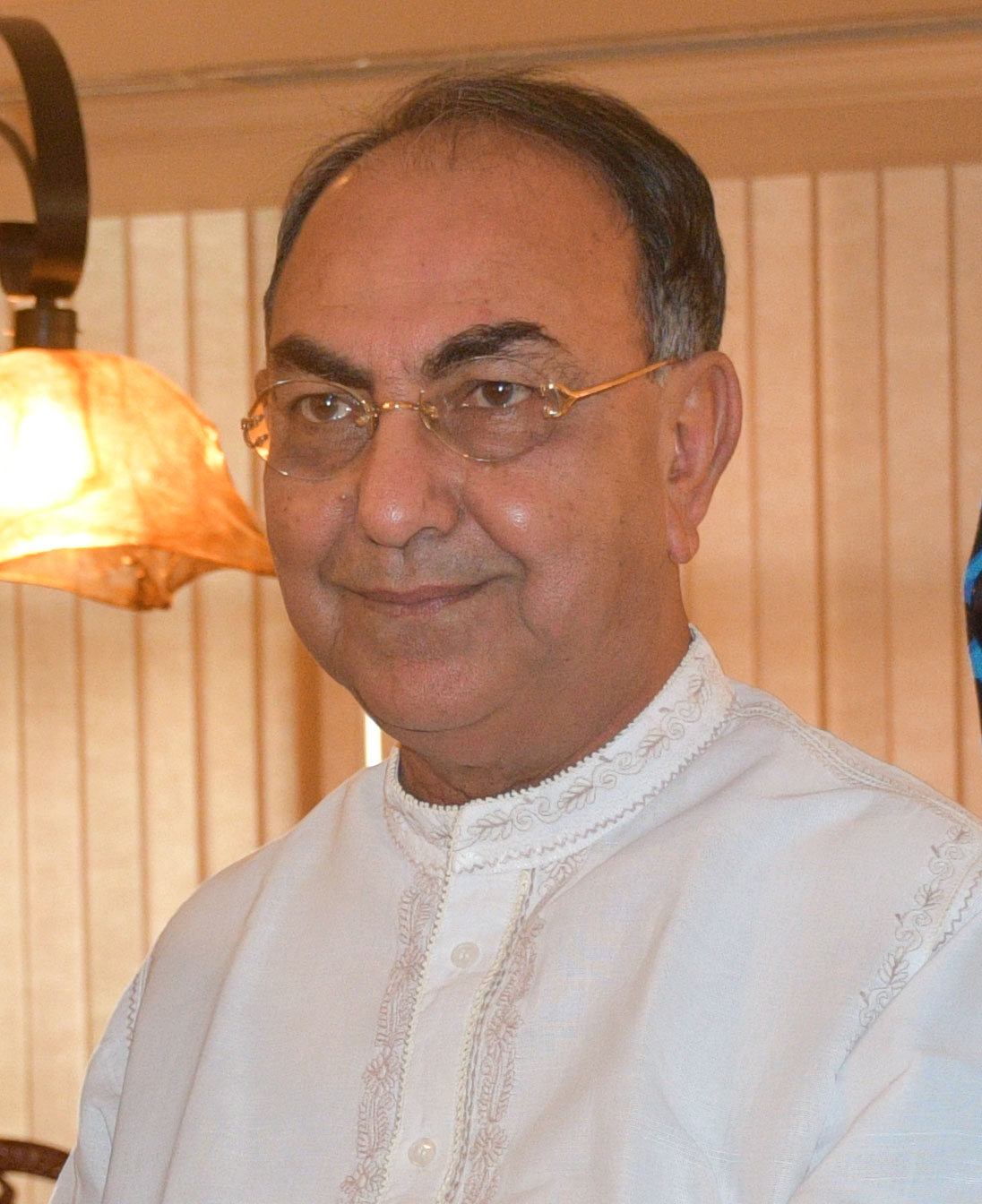
	First party	Second party
Candidate	Sayeed Khokon	Mirza Abbas
Party	AL	BNP
Popular vote	535,296	294,291
Percentage	59.12%	32.50%
Swing	New	New
Mayor before election
New post
Elected Mayor
Sayeed Khokon
AL
- Council election
- 30 April 2015; 76 seats in the Dhaka South City Corporation
Party	Leader	Seats	+/–
AL	Sayeed Khokon	54	+54
BNP	Mirza Abbas	8	+8
Independent	—	14	+14
This lists parties that won seats. See the complete results below.

The 2015 Dhaka South City Corporation election was a local government election held in Dhaka, on 30 April 2015 to elect the Mayor of South Dhaka and the City Council. A total of 20 candidates contested the mayoral race. The result was a victory for the Awami League candidate Sayeed Khokon. In the 76 member City Council, the Awami League won 54 seats, while the BNP won 8 seats, and the remaining seats were won by others. However, the results were rejected by the main opposition candidate, Mirza Abbas of the Bangladesh Nationalist Party. The candidates received neutral election symbols in this election.

== Mayoral election results ==
DSCC Mayor Election 2015
Candidate	Party	Votes	%
Sayeed Khokon	Awami League	535,296	59.12
Mirza Abbas	BNP	294,291	32.50
Abdur Rahman	ISAB	14,784	1.63
Mohammed Saifuddin	Jatiya Party	4,519	0.50
Abu Naser Mohammed	Independent	2,197	0.24
Rezaul Karim	Independent	2,173	0.24
Sahin Khan	Independent	2,074	0.23
Golam Maula Rony	Independent	1,887	0.21
Sahidul Islam	Independent	1,239	0.14
Bazlur Rashid	Independent	1,029	0.11
Zahidur Rahman	Independent	988	0.11
Asaduzzaman Ripon	Independent	928	0.10
A S M Akram	Independent	682	0.08
Dilip Vodro	Independent	669	0.07
Abdul Khalek	Independent	550	0.06
Safi Ullah Chowdhury	Independent	512	0.06
Mashiur Rahman	Independent	508	0.06
Aktaruzzaman	Independent	362	0.04
Ayub Husen	Independent	354	0.04
Bahrane Sultan	Independent	312	0.03
Invalid		40,130	4.43
Majority		241,005	26.62
Turnout		905,484	48.40
Total Registered		1,870,778	
AL Gain (New Seat)			

== Council election results ==
=== Party-wise ===
2015 DSCC council election results (party-wise)
Party	Leader	Councilor contested seats	Councilor elected in Seats	Ward Councilors	Reserved Women Councilors
Bangladesh Awami League	Sayeed Khokon	76	54 / 76	37	17
Bangladesh Nationalist Party	Mirza Abbas	76	8 / 76	7	1
Independent	unknown		14 / 76	13	1
Total			76	57	19
