= 2020 Dhaka South City Corporation election =

Mayoral election in Bangladesh

- 1 February 2020
- Registered: 2,453,194 (▲31.13 pp)
- Turnout: 29.00% (▼19.4 pp)
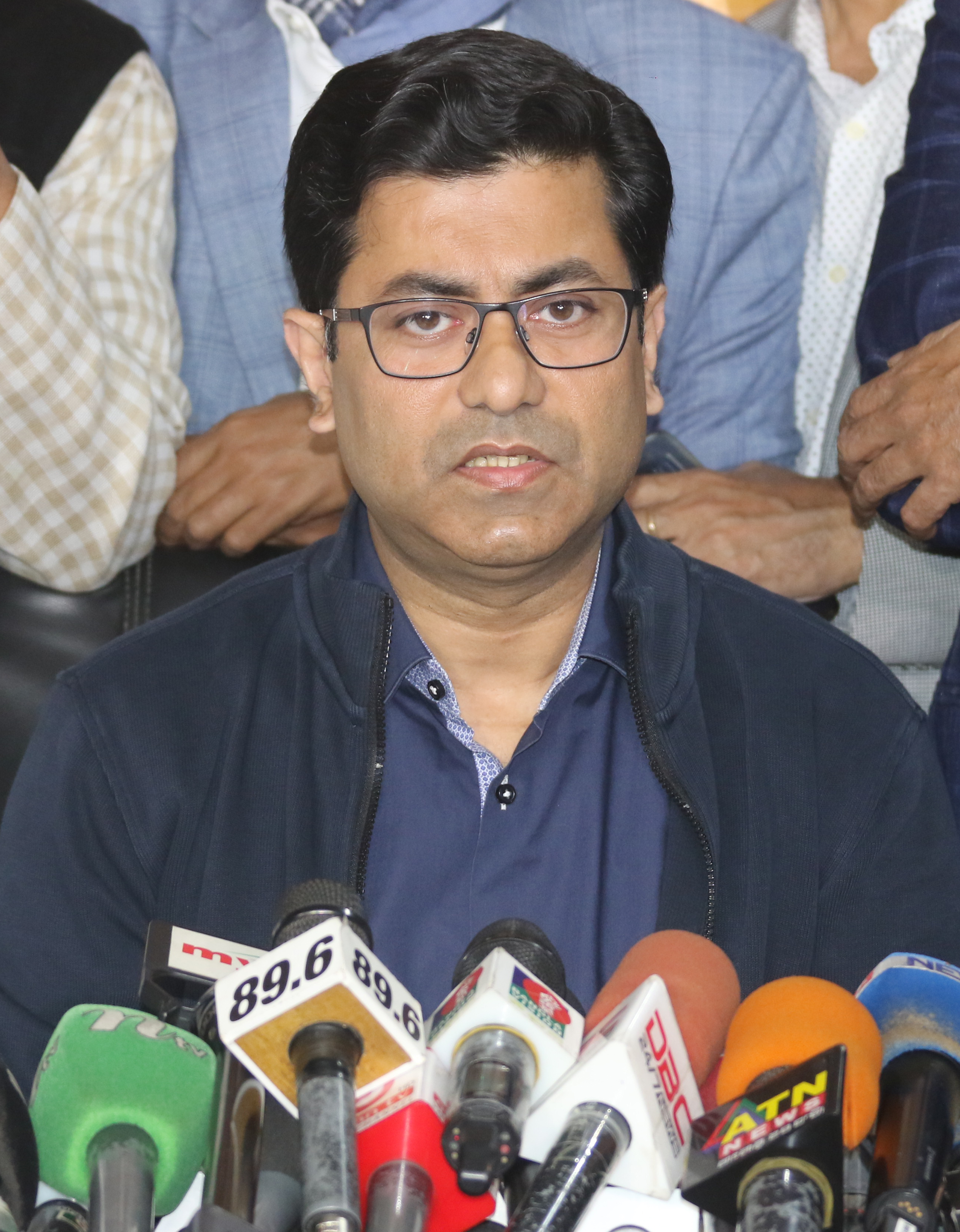

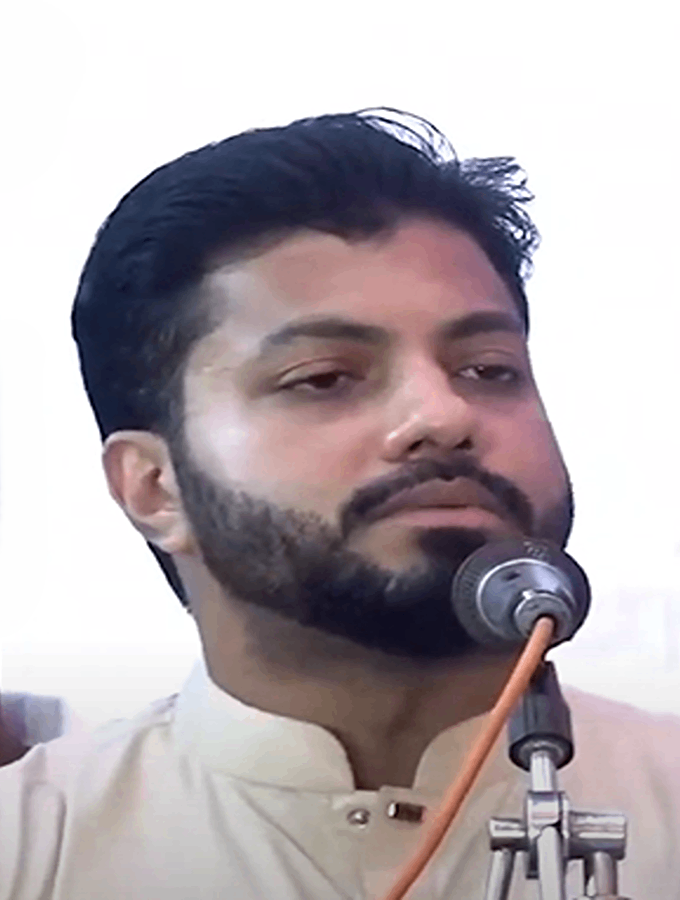
	First party	Second party
Candidate	Sheikh Fazle Noor Taposh	Ishraque Hossain
Party	AL	BNP
Popular vote	424,595	236,512
Percentage	60.76%	33.84%
Swing	▲1.64pp	▲1.34pp
Mayor before election
Sayeed Khokon
AL
Elected Mayor
Sheikh Fazle Noor Taposh
AL
- Council election
- 1 February 2020; 100 seats in the Dhaka South City Corporation
Party	Leader	Seats	+/–
AL	Sheikh Fazle Noor Taposh	81	+27
BNP	Ishraque Hossain	9	+1
BJP	Didn't participate	1	+1
Independent	—	9	−5
This lists parties that won seats. See the complete results below.

The 2020 Dhaka South City Corporation election was a local government election held in Dhaka on 1 February 2020 to elect the mayor of South Dhaka and the city council. A total of 6 candidates contested the mayoral race. The result was a victory for the Awami League candidate Sheikh Fazle Noor Taposh. In the 100-member city council, the Awami League won 81 seats, while the Bangladesh Nationalist Party (BNP) won 9 seats, and the remaining seats were won by others. However, the results were rejected by the main opposition candidate, Ishraque Hossain of the BNP. This election was marred by violence, and it was not seen as a free, fair, and credible election. In 2024, after the ruling Awami League regime fell, vote rigging by Awami League was confirmed in this election.

It was one of the first major elections in Bangladesh conducted entirely using electronic voting machines (EVMs) alongside the 2020 Dhaka North City Corporation election. Previously the country had made only limited use of EVMs. The ruling party, the Awami League, supported the adoption of EVMs. Leaders of other parties, including the Bangladesh Nationalist Party, said they feared the machines would be used for vote rigging. One concern expressed was that the machines do not have a voter-verified paper audit trail.

== Candidates ==
The election was mainly contested between candidates of the two major political parties in Bangladesh:

List of mayoral candidates
Party	Flag	Symbol	Candidates
Bangladesh Awami League			Sheikh Fazle Noor Taposh
Bangladesh Nationalist Party			Ishraque Hossain

Other minor candidates from smaller parties and independent candidates also participated.

== Timeline ==
Poll Event	Schedule
Official declaration from the Election Commission	22 December 2019
Declaration of the schedule	22 December 2019
Application deadline for candidates	31 December 2019
Scrutiny of nomination	2 January 2020
Last Date for Withdrawal of nomination	9 January 2020
Symbol allocation	10 January 2020
Start of campaign period	10 January 2020
End of campaign period	30 January 2020
Date of Poll	1 February 2020
Date of Counting of Votes	1 February 2020

== Mayoral election results ==
Election Results
Candidate	Party	Votes	Percentage	+/-
Sheikh Fazle Noor Taposh	Bangladesh Awami League	424,595	60.76	New
Ishraque Hossain	Bangladesh Nationalist Party	236,512	33.84	New
Abdur Rahman	Islami Andolan Bangladesh	26,525	3.79	New
Saifuddin Ahmen Milon	Jatiya Party (Ershad)	5,593	0.80	New
Bahrane Sultan Bahar	National People's Party	3,155	0.45	New
Akhtaruzzaman Alias Ayatullah	Bangladesh Congress	2,421	0.34	New
Rejected Ballot		12,678	1.78	-
Majority		188,083	26.91	+1.64
Turnout		711,488	29.00	-19.4
Total Registered Voters		2,453,194	-	
AL Hold		Swing		

== Council election results ==
=== Party-wise ===
2020 DSCC council election results (party-wise)
Party	Leader	Councilor contested seats	Councilor elected in Seats	Ward Councilors	Reserved Women Councilors
Bangladesh Awami League	Sheikh Fazle Noor Taposh	100	81 / 100	61	20
Bangladesh Nationalist Party	Ishraque Hossain	100	9 / 100	6	3
Bangladesh Jatiya Party	Didn't participate	unknown	1 / 100	1	0
Independent	unknown		9 / 100	7	2
Total			100	75	25
