= Ishraque Hossain =

Bangladeshi politician

- ইশরাক হোসেন
- Hossain in 2026

Member of the Bangladesh Parliament for Dhaka-6
- Incumbent
- Assumed office 17 February 2026
- Preceded by: Sayeed Khokon

Minister of State for Liberation War Affairs
- In office 17 February 2026 – 19 October 2026
- Prime Minister: Tarique Rahman
- Preceded by: A. B. Tajul Islam
- Succeeded by: Vacant

Personal details
- Born: 5 April 1987 (age 39) Dhaka, Bangladesh
- Party: Bangladesh Nationalist Party
- Spouse: Nusrat Khan (m. 2026)
- Relations: Noor Muhammad Khan (father-in-law)
- Parent: Sadeque Hossain Khoka (father)
- Education: University of Hertfordshire
- Profession: Politician
- Website: www.ishraque.com

Ishraque Hossain (born 5 April 1987) is a Bangladeshi politician and a member of the Bangladesh Nationalist Party. He is the incumbent member of Jatiya Sangsad representing the Dhaka-6 constituency at the 13th Jatiya Sangsad. He served as the State Minister for Liberation War Affairs from 17 February 2026 until his resignation on 19 October 2026.

== Early life and education ==
Ishraque Hossain was born on 5 April 1987 in Dhaka, Bangladesh. His father, Sadeque Hossain Khoka, was a politician. He completed his early education at Scholastica School and later pursued mechanical engineering at the University of Hertfordshire in England, where he earned his undergraduate and master's degrees.

== Political career ==
Following the death of Sadeque Hossain Khoka in November 2019, Hossain joined politics on the foundation of his father. On 1 February 2020, Hossain contested the mayoral election of the Dhaka South City Corporation as a BNP candidate. In the preliminary results, he received 236,000 votes, while the Awami League candidate Sheikh Fazle Noor Taposh won with 424,000 votes. The BNP rejected the election results, alleging vote rigging and irregularities. He filed legal case. Following July Uprising, Election Tribunal declared him mayor on 27 March 2025. He was unable to take oath as Mayor due to further legal challenges.

He won the 2026 general election as the candidate for Dhaka-6, receiving 78,850 votes, and was sworn in as a member of the 13th Jatiya Sangsad. On 17 February 2026, he took charge as State Minister for Ministry of Liberation War Affairs. He resigned from the post on 19 October 2026.

== Controversies ==
=== Dhaka South City Corporation Mayor controversy ===
After Bangladesh Election Commission issued gazette declaring Ishraque Hossain as Mayor, a dispute with the interim government rose over his oath swearing. This led to High Court hearing. In May 2025, his supporters surrounded Dhaka South City Corporation headquarters, demanding that he be administered the oath of office. The blockade disrupted civic services and authorities temporarily locked the city hall gates. The demonstration by his supporters demanding that he take the oath to become mayor was criticized and caused controversy. Asif Mahmud said that since the term had expired, the government would not administer the oath again.

=== July Uprising program controversy ===
On 5 August 2026, celebrating the second anniversary of July Uprising, the Ministry of Liberation War Affairs organized program. During a documentary screening, families of those killed and leaders of National Citizen Party (NCP), objected to a screened documentary alleging inaccurate portray of the continuity of the July Uprising. NCP alleged that despite Nahid Islam announced the one-point movement, in the documentary Tarique Rahman was portrayed as the announcer. During chaos at the venue, Ishraque Hossain made provocative speech saying to protestors, "Have you come to assert yourself? Have you come to show a documentary? What are you doing? What have you done for the martyrs? You have done nothing for the martyrs." Tension increased further after his speech. The NCP leaders left in protest. As situation worsened diplomats left the venue. Hafiz Uddin Ahmad, then acting President, criticized the documentary also the chaotic incident.

=== 2026 firearm controversy ===
On 17 October 2026, Ishraque Hossain with some Bangladesh Jatiotabadi Chatra Dal leaders led a self-described anti-narcotics raid on a slum adjacent to the railway line in Ward 45 of Gendaria Police Station in his constituency Dhaka-6. A video posted on his Facebook page (later removed) showed him and his bodyguards openly displaying firearms, shouting threats, assaulting and detaining random individuals before handing them over to the police. The incident sparked widespread criticism, questioning the legal status of such act conducted by non-law enforcement individuals. The firearm policy prohibits the display of weapons to agitate others. Hossain claimed the weapons were legally acquired in late 2025 for self-defence purposes. He also claimed to have received complaints from the locals about drug dens and police inaction in the area. Dhaka Metropolitan Police (DMP), undertook an investigation into the act of displaying weapon. Hossain claimed that he displayed the weapon in self-defence. Gendaria Police Station said Hossain had detained six people before the police took them into custody.

This incident created discomfort and dissatisfaction within the Bangladesh Nationalist Party and its government. On the following day, Prime Minister Tarique Rahman ordered Ishraque to resign from the cabinet, which he denied as untrue. His office threatened legal action against media outlets to force the withdrawal of reports alleging misinformation. The next day, he announced his resignation.

Bangladesh Jamaat-e-Islami issued a statement condemning the brandishing of firearms under the guise of anti-drug operations, calling it "reign of terror." Islami Andolan Bangladesh has also criticized the exercise, saying that Ishraque "promoted terrorism". Author Mohiuddin Ahmad commenting on the issue called Ishraque Hossain's acts as "blatant display of power, immaturity, and arrogance."

== Personal life ==
On 10 October 2025, Hossain engaged to Nusrat Khan, the eldest daughter of politician Noor Muhammad Khan. They got married in 2026. She is a Barrister based in the United Kingdom.
