= Ward No. 1 (Dhaka South City Corporation) =

Ward No.1 Dhaka South ১ নং ওয়ার্ড, ঢাকা দক্ষিণ
- Ward
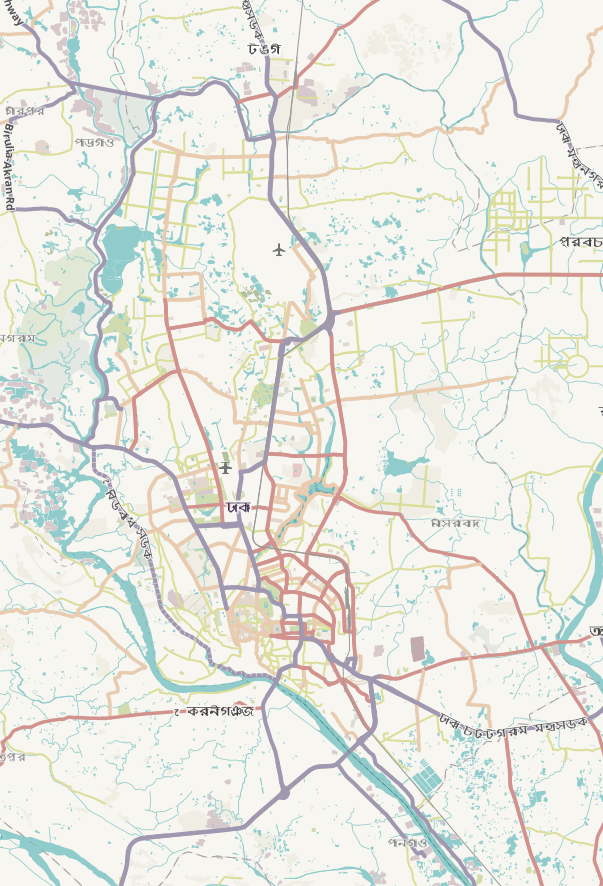
- Coordinates: 23°45′N 90°25.6′E
- Country: Bangladesh
- Division: Dhaka Division
- District: Dhaka District
- Megacity: Dhaka
- Thana: Khilgaon
- Jatiya Sangsad constituency: Dhaka-9
- Formed: 1 December 2011; 14 years ago

Government
  - Type: Mayor–Council
  - Body: Dhaka South City Corporation
  - Councillor: Vacant
- Time zone: UTC+6 (BST)
- Postal code: 1219
- Website: dscc.portal.gov.bd

Ward No. 1 Dhaka South City Corporation (Bengali: ওয়ার্ড নং ১, ঢাকা দক্ষিণ সিটি কর্পোরেশন) is an administrative division of Dhaka South City Corporation in zone 1, which was formerly known as ward no. 24 of Dhaka City Corporation. It's located in Khilgaon Thana of Dhaka City. It forms a city corporation council electoral constituency and is a part of Bangladesh Jatiyo Sangshad constituency Dhaka-9.

== Overview ==
The ward covers Blocks A and C under Khilgaon Thana.

== Election highlights ==
Zone	Old ward	Election	Councillor	Political party	Ref.
	24				
01		2015	Wahidul Hasan Milton	Bangladesh Awami League	
