= Abul Hasnat (barrister) =

Bangladeshi politician and lawyer (died 2022)

- আবুল হাসনাত

1st Mayor of Dhaka
- In office 3 December 1990 – 12 December 1990
- Preceded by: Naziur Rahman Manzur
- Succeeded by: Mirza Abbas
- In office 31 October 1977 – 9 May 1982
- Preceded by: Position established
- Succeeded by: Mohammad Abdul Malek

Minister of Housing and Public Works
- In office 27 November 1981 – 10 May 1982
- President: Abdus Sattar
- Prime Minister: Shah Azizur Rahman; Ataur Rahman Khan
- Preceded by: Muhammad Jamiruddin Sarkar
- Succeeded by: Abdul Mannan Siddique
- In office 20 October 1990 – 6 December 1990
- President: Hussain Muhammad Ershad
- Prime Minister: Kazi Zafar Ahmed
- Preceded by: Mostafa Jamal Haider
- Succeeded by: Wahiduddin Ahmed

Member of the Bangladesh Parliament for Dhaka-9
- In office 24 May 1990 – 6 December 1990
- Preceded by: Md Korban Ali
- Succeeded by: Muhammad Jamiruddin Sarkar

2nd Chief Whip of Parliament
- In office 2 April 1979 – 24 March 1982
- Speaker: Mirza Ghulam Hafiz
- Preceded by: Shah Moazzem Hossain
- Succeeded by: T.I.M. Fazlay Rabbi Chowdhury

Personal details
- Born: c. 1940 Lalbagh, Dacca district, Bengal Province
- Died: 16 September 2022 (aged 82) London, England
- Resting place: Azimpur Graveyard, Dhaka, Bangladesh
- Party: Bangladesh Nationalist Party
- Other political affiliations: Jatiya Party (Ershad)

Abul Hasnat (c. 1940 – 16 September 2022) was a Bangladeshi politician and lawyer. He was a founding member of the Bangladesh Nationalist Party standing committee.

== Early life and family ==
Abul Hasnat was born in c. 1940 to a Bengali family of Sardars in Lalbagh, Old Dhaka. His father, Ghani Sardar, was a former chairman of the Azimpur Union Committee.

== Political life ==
Abul Hasnat served as the first mayor (elected by the commissioners) of Dhaka City Corporation during 1977–1982 and, again, in 1990. In the cabinet of Abdus Sattar, he served as the minister of housing and public works from 27 November 1981 to 10 May 1982.

Abul Hasnat joined the Jatiya Party in 1990. He was elected to parliament from Dhaka-9 in 1990 in a by-election as a candidate of Jatiya Party. He served as the minister of housing and public works in the cabinet of Hussein Mohammad Ershad from 20 October 1990 to 6 December 1990.

Abul Hasnat later rejoined the Bangladesh Nationalist Party and served as a member of the BNP's standing committee.

== Death ==
Abul Hasnat died at 5pm on 16 September 2022 in his own home in London, England. He was buried next to his father at the Azimpur Graveyard in Dhaka.
