= Sadeque Hossain Khoka =

Bangladeshi politician (1952–2019)

- সাদেক হোসেন খোকা

7th Mayor of Dhaka
- In office 25 April 2002 – 29 November 2011
- Preceded by: Mohammad Hanif
- Succeeded by: Position abolished

Minister of Fisheries and Livestock
- In office 10 October 2001 – 22 May 2003
- Prime Minister: Khaleda Zia
- Preceded by: A. S. M. Abdur Rab
- Succeeded by: Abdus Sattar Bhuiyan

Minister of State for Youth and Sports
- In office 17 May 1991 – 19 March 1996
- Prime Minister: Khaleda Zia
- Preceded by: Mirza Abbas
- Succeeded by: Obaidul Quader

Member of the Bangladesh Parliament for Dhaka-7
- In office 20 March 1991 – 29 October 2006
- Preceded by: Jahangir Mohammad Adel
- Succeeded by: Mostofa Jalal Mohiuddin

Personal details
- Born: 12 May 1952 Dacca, East Bengal, Pakistan
- Died: 4 November 2019 (aged 67) New York City, United States
- Party: Bangladesh Nationalist Party
- Spouse: Ismat Ara
- Children: 3, including Ishraque
- Education: University of Dhaka (MA)

Military service
- Branch/service: Mukti Bahini
- Years of service: 1971
- Battles/wars: Bangladesh Liberation War

Sadeque Hossain Khoka (12 May 1952 – 4 November 2019) was a Bangladeshi politician. He served as the 7th mayor of Dhaka from 2002 to 2011. He was the vice chairman of the Bangladesh Nationalist Party and was president of the undivided Dhaka city BNP for the longest period of the organisation's existence.

== Early life and career ==
Khoka attended Dhaka University and completed an M.A. in psychology. In 1971, at the age of 19, he fought in the Bangladesh Liberation War. After independence, he worked in organizing soccer, rising to the positions of general secretary of the Dhaka Metropolitan Football Association and joint general secretary of the Bangladesh Football Federation. Khoka was the key person of the football club Brothers Union.

Khoka was first elected to the Jatiyo Sangshad (national legislature) in 1991. In the same year, he was made state minister of youth and sports. Khoka also won from his constituency in elections in 1996 and 2001. After the Bangladesh Nationalist Party's victory in 2001, Khoka was made cabinet minister of fisheries and livestock. Being in the office, he fought the Dhaka City Corporation election for mayorship and won. He took office as the mayor of Dhaka on 25 April 2002. He served as both minister and mayor till 2004, when he resigned from the ministry.

Khoka resigned from the mayoral duties of Dhaka on 29 November 2011, when the government passed a bill in parliament to split DCC (Dhaka City Corporation) into two parts and renamed them DCC North and DCC South.

In 2013, Khoka compared the crackdown on Hefazat protestors to the Pakistani crackdown on 25 March and Jalianwala Bagh massacres. In response, Detective Branch police raided the houses of Sadeque Hossain Khoka and Bangladesh Jatiya Party chairman Andaleeve Rahman Partha.

== Family ==
Khoka was married to Ismat Ara and had two sons and a daughter. His eldest son, Ishraque Hossain, is a politician and Bangladesh Nationalist Party candidate in the 2018 mayoral election in Dhaka. Another son, Ishfaque Hossain, is now a bachelor-level student from the University of Hertfordshire. His daughter, Sarika Sadeque, is married to Ahmed Iftekhar, son of Ahmad Nazir, ex parliament member. Both of them pursued an MBA degree from Durham University.

== Death ==
Khoka died from cancer on 4 November 2019 in New York.
