= Mohammad Hanif (politician) =

Bangladeshi politician

- মোহাম্মদ হানিফ

6th Mayor of Dhaka
- In office 12 March 1994 – 4 April 2002
- Preceded by: Mirza Abbas
- Succeeded by: Sadeque Hossain Khoka

President of Bangladesh Football Federation
- In office 6 July 1996 – July 2001
- Vice President: AH Mofazzal Karim
- Preceded by: Oli Ahmad
- Succeeded by: AM Azizul Haque

Personal details
- Born: 1 April 1944 Dacca, British India
- Died: 28 November 2006 (aged 62) Dhaka, Bangladesh
- Resting place: Azimpur Graveyard
- Party: Bangladesh Awami League
- Spouse: Fatema Hanif
- Children: Sayeed Khokon

Mohammad Hanif (died 28 November 2006) was a Bangladeshi politician who served as the mayor of Dhaka from 1994 to 2002. He also served as the president of the Awami League Dhaka Metropolitan Unit and the Bangladesh Football Federation.

== Career ==
Hanif started his political career when he was student. He was an elected parliament member from Dhaka-12 constituency in 1973 and served as a whip of the National Parliament. He also served as the president of Dhaka City Awami League for long time.

Hanif was elected the mayor of Dhaka City Corporation on 12 March 1994, the first elected mayor of Dhaka City corporation. The election was held under the Dhaka city act of 1993. As mayor he tried to increase the power of the city corporation. He asked to have the management of Dhaka Metropolitan police, Dhaka electricity supply company and other utilities companies transferred to Dhaka City Corporation from the national government. A move that drew opposition from the national government.

On 15 February 1996 the Bangladesh Nationalist Party led by Khaleda Zia held national elections which were boycotted by all major parties. The voter turnout was 21% with Bangladesh Nationalist Party winning all the parliamentary seats. He set up Janatar Mancha (Peoples stages) demanding the resignation of Prime Minister Khaleda Zia in front of Bangladesh National Press Club. He played a vital role in the protests that forced the government to hold elections, which the Bangladesh Awami League won. Hanif served as the president of the Bangladesh Football Federation from 1996 to 2001, before being replaced by AM Azizul Haque during the Caretaker government regime.

Hanif suffered splinter injuries during the 2004 Dhaka grenade attack on a Bangladesh Awami League rally on Bangabandhu Avenue in Dhaka.

== Death and legacy ==
Hanif was taken to Bumrungrad Hospital in Bangkok on February 10, 2006, and returned on August 25 after a six-month treatment. On 28 November 2006, he died at Apollo Hospital due to multiple organ failures.

The largest flyover in Bangladesh, located in Dhaka, Mayor Mohammad Hanif Flyover, is named after him.

New creation	Mayor of Dhaka City Corporation; 1994–2002	Succeeded by Sadeque Hossain Khoka
