= Modhumoti Bank =

Bank in Bangladesh

Modhumoti Bank PLC.
- Type: Public Limited Company
- Industry: Bank
- Headquarters: Dhaka, Bangladesh
- Key people: Mr. Humayun Kabir (Chairman)
- Website: www.modhumotibankplc.com

Modhumoti Bank PLC. is a private limited commercial bank in Bangladesh. The bank was established in 2013. Md Shafiul Azam is the chief executive officer of the bank. Humayun Kabir was the chairperson and Sheikh Salahuddin Jewel was the vice chairman of the bank. Sheikh Fazle Noor Taposh was also a director of the bank. The bank has network of 53 branches and 4 sub-branches around the country.

== History ==
Modhumoti Bank Limited was established on 19 September 2013. Md Shafiul Azam was appointed managing director of the bank in August 2016.

In 2018, Modhumoti announced plans to focus on becoming a bank for Small Middle Enterprise in rural areas.

In August 2019, Md Shafiul Azam was re-appointed managing director of Modhumoti Bank Limited. From 2018 to 2019, non performing loans at the bank increased by 555 per cent to 580 million taka.

Former Mayor of Dhaka South City Corporation, Sayeed Khokon, accused the incumbent mayor of North Dhaka and Modhumoti Bank Limited director, Sheikh Fazle Noor Taposh, of hording illegal wealth at the Bank in January 2021. Khokon was sued for defamation by lawyers aligned with Taposh. In June 2021, The Credit Rating Agency of Bangladesh rated the bank as A1 category. Manwar Hossain, son of Anwar Hossain and chairman of Anwar Group of Industries in a director of the bank.

== Board of directors ==
Name	Position	Representing	Reference
Humayun Kabir	Chairman		
Shaikh Salahuddin	Director		
Sheikh Fazle Noor Taposh	Director		
Mohammad Ismail Hossain	Director	Sharmin Apparels Limited	
Nemai Kumer Saha	Director	Sandhani Life Insurance Company Limited	
Salahuddin Alamgir	Director		
Mostafa Kamal	Director	Tanveer Oils Limited	
Tanjima Binthe Mostafa	Director	Everest Power Generation Co. Limited	
Humayun Kabir Bablu	Director		
Shahana Yasmin	Director		
Sultana Jahan	Director		
A Mannan Khan	Director		
Ferdousi Islam	Director	Azbal International Limited	
Manwar Hossain	Director	Anwar Jute Spinning Mills Limited	
Tanveer Ahmed Mostafa	Director	Meghna Flour & Dal Mills Limited	
Md. Mahbubur Rahman	Director		
Didarul Alam	Director		
Syeda Sharmin Hossain	Director	Sharmin Fashions Limited	
Yusuf Hussain Humayun	Independent Director		
Shaheduzzaman Choudhury	Independent Director		
Md. Shafiul Azam	CEO and managing director		
