= Sayeed Khokon =

Bangladeshi businessman and politician

- সাঈদ খোকন
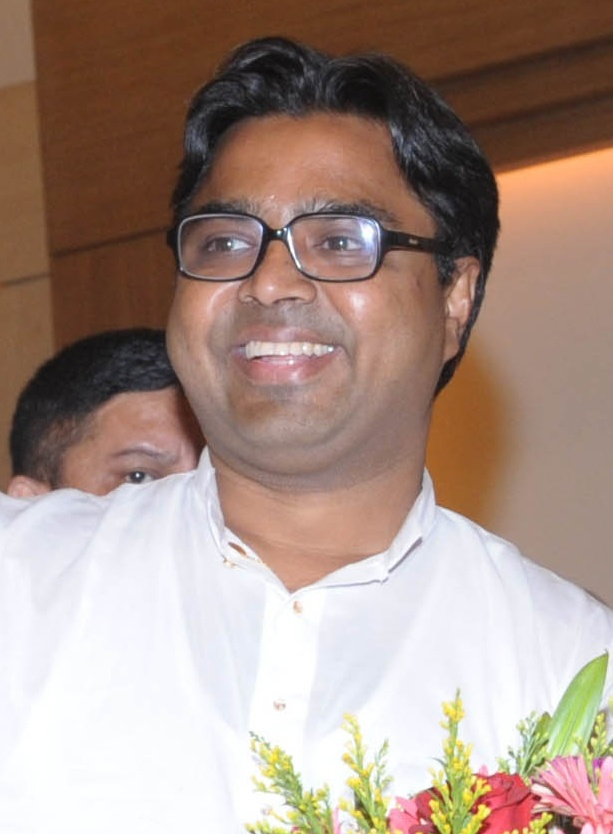
- Khokon in 2015

Member of Parliament
- In office 29 January 2024 – 6 August 2024
- Preceded by: Kazi Firoz Rashid
- Succeeded by: Ishraque Hossain
- Constituency: Dhaka-6

1st Mayor of South Dhaka
- In office 7 May 2015 – 7 May 2020
- Preceded by: Post established
- Succeeded by: Sheikh Fazle Noor Taposh

Personal details
- Born: 19 June 1970 (age 56) Dhaka, East Pakistan, Pakistan
- Party: Bangladesh Awami League
- Spouse: Farhana Sayeed
- Parents: Mohammad Hanif (father); Fatema Hanif (mother)
- Education: Dhaka City College
- Occupation: Businessman, politician

Sayeed Khokon is a Bangladeshi businessman, politician and a former Jatiya Sangsad member representing the Dhaka-6 constituency. He was mayor of Dhaka South City Corporation from 2015 to 2020. He is the executive member of the Bangladesh Awami League Central Committee. His father, Mohammad Hanif, was first elected mayor of Dhaka City Corporation.

== Early life ==
Khokon's father Mohammad Hanif was the first elected mayor of Dhaka City.

== Career ==
Khokon collected nomination form of Awami League on 24 March 2015. He won in the first Dhaka South City Corporation election on 29 April 2015.

On 26 July 2017, Khokon blamed Dhaka Water Supply and Sewerage Authority for water logging problems in the city.

On 26 December 2019, Khokon collected Dhaka South City Corporation nomination papers from Awami League. The nomination went to Sheikh Fazle Noor Taposh and Khokon accordingly accepted the decision of the party and party president, Prime Minister Sheikh Hasina.

A case was filed against Sayeed Khokon and several other for allegedly embezzling 350m BDT by the Gulistan Fulbaria City Supermarket-2 owners' association president Md Delwar Hossain in December 2020. The money had been paid for allocation of shops in block A between 2015 and 2019 which were later demolished for violating the original design of the complex. 911 shops were demolished by the city corporation on 9 December.

Judge KM Emrul Kayesh of Dhaka Court on 28 June 2021 order the accounts of Khokon and his wife, sister, and mother be frozen. The accounts were frozen after a request from the deputy director of the Anti-Corruption Commission Jalal Uddin Ahmed who was in charge of the investigation on Khokon. On 28 July 2021, the Bangladesh Financial Intelligence Unit sought information on accounts held by Khokon from banks in Bangladesh. He blamed his successor, Sheikh Fazle Noor Taposh, for instigating the actions of the Anti Corruption Commission. Taposh did not respond to the allegations. He also alleged his successor kept millions of city corporation funds in Modhumoti Bank Limited, which Taposh owned. Two defamation suits were filed against Khokon for his comments about Taposh but Taposh himself called for their withdrawal.

Khokon was nominated by the Bangladesh Awami League to be the member of parliament for the Dhaka-6 constituency in the 12th National Parliament election. On 7 January 2024, he was elected by a huge margin. The election was reported by international observers to be a one-sided election because it was boycotted by all major opposition parties. After the fall of Sheikh Hasina's government, Khokon's house was ransacked and looted. He has gone into hiding ever since along with his family members. A travel ban was imposed on him in December 2024. He and his family's accounts were frozen and his property attached by court orders following petition by the Anti-Corruption Commission.

Khokon has been accused of misappropriating funds from Islami Insurance Bangladesh Limited. In August 2024, Jugantor reported allegations by former directors that Khokon had assumed the chairmanship in 2012 after the removal of the company's previous chairman, Tofazzal Hossain, and subsequently continued in the position without holding elections. They further alleged eight directors of the company were removed by Khokon and he appointed his own family members as directors, including his wife, sister, wife's sister, sister's husband, two underage daughters and other close relatives. According to the report, Khokon and several family members allegedly received board meeting fees despite being absent from meetings. Khokon also took a unilateral decision to sell the insurance company's two offices located in Purana Paltan & New Paltan, and shifted the company's office to a leased floor in his own building located in Banani.

Special Response Battalion arrested Khokon on 17 November 2026 from Baridhara and handed over to the Detective Branch. He was sent to seven day remand by the Dhaka Metropolitan Magistrate Court. He was shown arrested over a death of a protestor against former Prime Minister Sheikh Hasina. His lawyer, Shamim Al Syful Shohag, was assaulted by a group of men on the court premises and subsequently taken to Mitford Hospital. Sutrapur Police Station officer-in-charge Motiur Rahman stated police will interrogate him after he is released from prison.
