= Sutrapur Thana =

Thana in Dhaka South City Corporation, Bangladesh

Sutrapur Thana সূত্রাপুর থানা
- Thana
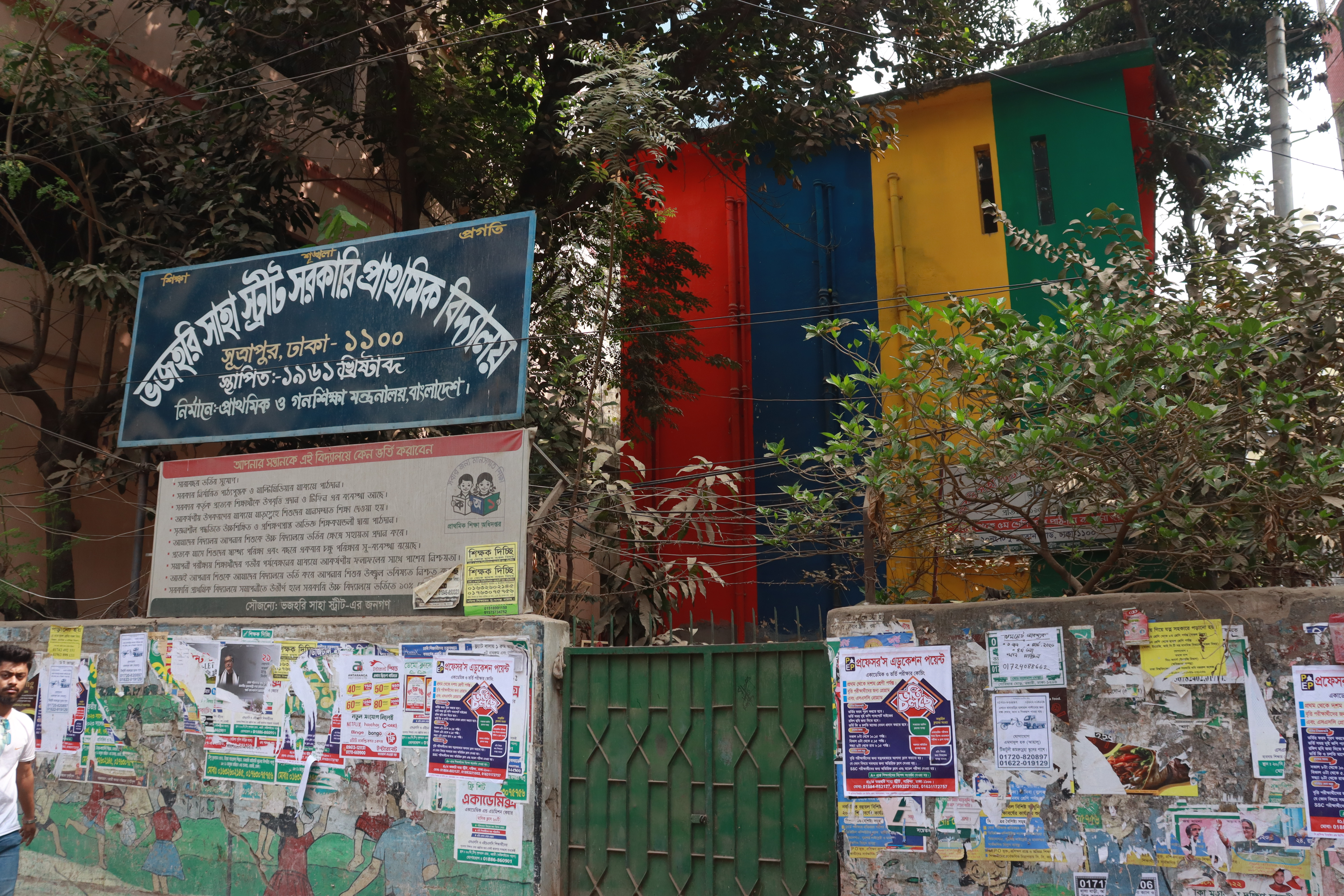
- Vojohori Shah street govt primary school
- Expandable map of vicinity of Sutrapur Thana
- Coordinates: 23.70638°N 90.41650°E
- Country: Bangladesh
- Division: Dhaka Division
- District: Dhaka District
- Established as a thana: 1976

Area
  - Total: 2.08 km^{2} (0.80 sq mi)
- Elevation: 23 m (75 ft)

Population (2022)
  - Total: 307,483
  - Density: 148,000/km^{2} (383,000/sq mi)
- Time zone: UTC+6 (BST)
- Postal code: 1100
- Area code: 02

Sutrapur (Bengali: সূত্রাপুর) is a Thana of Dhaka District in the Division of Dhaka, Bangladesh.

== Geography ==
Sutrapur is bounded by Paltan Thana, Motijheel Thana and Sabujbagh Thana on the north, Keraniganj Upazila on the south, Sabujbagh Thana, Jatrabari Thana and Gendaria Thana on the east and Kotwali Thana and Bangshal Thana on the west. It has a total area of 2.08 square kilometres (0.80 mi^{2}).

== Demographics ==
Religions in Sutrapur Thana (2022)
Religion	Percent
Islam	81.45%
Hinduism	17.52%
Christianity	0.83%
Other or not stated	0.20%

According to the 2022 Bangladeshi census, Sutrapur Thana had 21,022 households and a population of 85,033. 5.46% of the population were under 5 years of age. Sutrapur had a literacy rate (age 7 and over) of 90.06%: 89.98% for males and 90.16% for females, and a sex ratio of 125.76 males for every 100 females.

According to the 2011 Census of Bangladesh, Sutrapur Thana has a population of 211,210 with average household size of 4.9 members, and an average literacy rate of 79.9% against the national average of 51.8%.

== Economy ==
Sutrapur houses some of the oldest businesses in the city. Call Ready began in 1948 as Arju Light House, a small business that rented out lights and phonographs for events. They soon branched out into microphones and loudspeakers, supplying them for many historic political meetings and rallies. As of 2017, they still have a storefront in Lakshmibazar.

== Points of interest ==
- Bhajahari Lodge is an early 20th-century building on the Department of Archaeology's list of protected monuments.

== Education ==
Sutrapur is home to some of the old and renowned schools, like Government Shaheed Suhrawardy College, St Gregory's High School and College, Mitali Bidyapith High School, Dhaka Collegiate School, Muslim Government High School, and Pogose School, Dhaka.

== See also ==
- Upazilas of Bangladesh
- Districts of Bangladesh
- Divisions of Bangladesh
