= Nagar Bhaban =

Municipal office in Dhaka, Bangladesh

- নগর ভবন
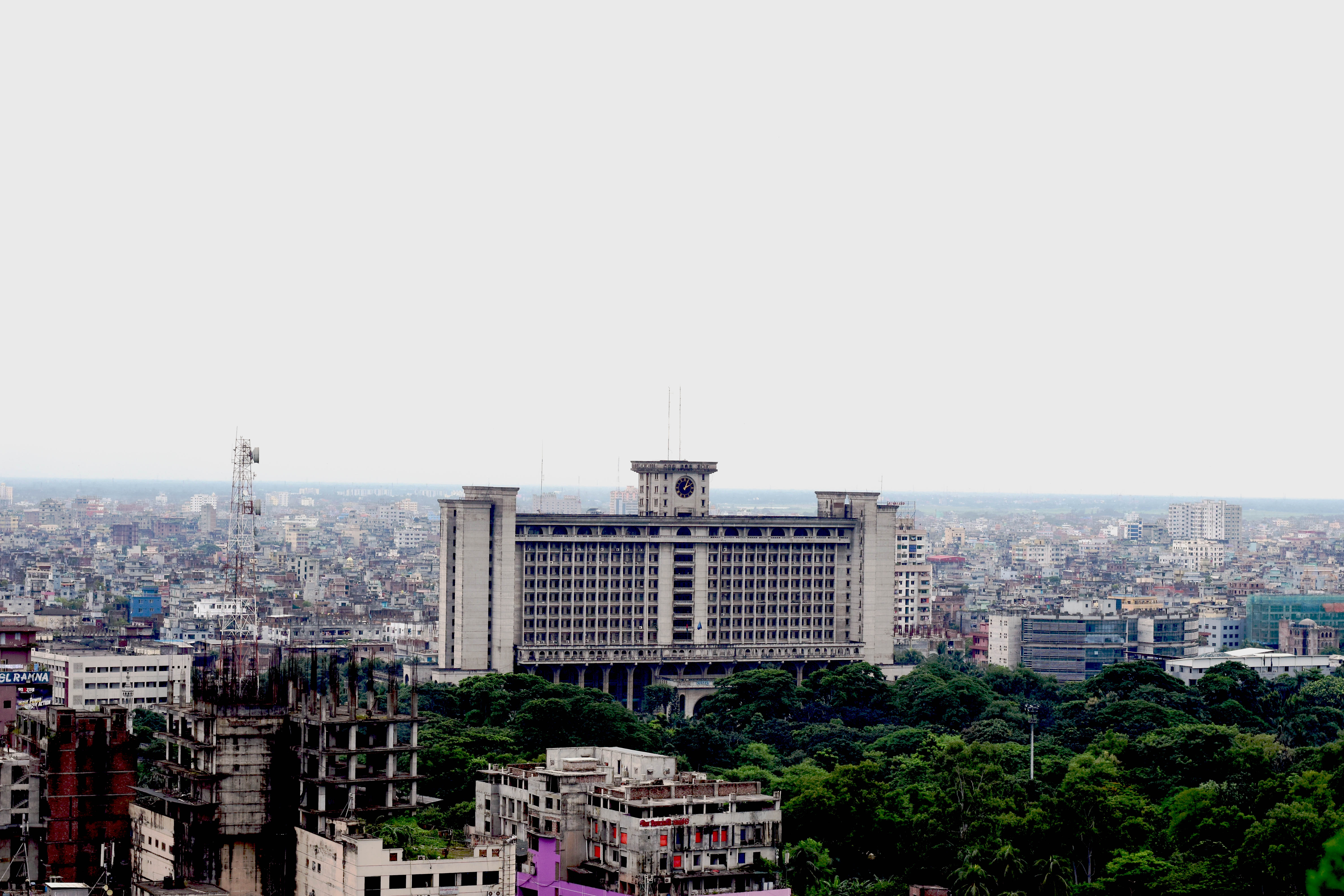
- Nagar Bhaban, located in Dhaka, Bangladesh

- Location within Dhaka

General information
- Status: Functioning
- Type: City Hall
- Location: Dhaka, Bangladesh
- Coordinates: 23.7239°N 90.4085°E
- Opened: 1995; 31 years ago
- Owner: Dhaka South City Corporation (2011–present); Dhaka City Corporation (1995–2011)

Technical details
- Floor area: 483,000 m^{2} (5,200,000 sq ft)

Design and construction
- Architects: A. Imamuddin; Lailun Nahar Ekram

Nagar Bhaban (Bengali: নগর ভবন) is a building in Dhaka, Bangladesh that serves as the town hall of Dhaka South City Corporation. Previously it housed the offices of the former Dhaka City Corporation, before the city corporation was divided into North and South, as a result of the Local Government (City Corporation) Amendment Act 2011. The building is situated near the University of Dhaka campus and adjacent to the Bangladesh Police headquarters.

== Architecture ==
The building was designed by A. Imamuddin and Lailun Nahar Ekram, and was completed in 1995. It is a 15-storey city hall building containing offices, a bank, meeting rooms, a museum, dining facilities, a prayer hall, the mayor's office, and public terraces. The building has huge columns and arched gateways at its entrance and in the rear. There are two clocks at the top of the building on the north and south face. The building has a finished concrete texture, which gives it a timeless appearance and keeps maintenance cost low. The garden in front helps one to have a better view of the building.

The building is symmetrical in plan. Architects Qazi Azizul Mowla and A.T.M. Masood Reza wrote:

Nagar Bhaban is the result of a philosophy of assimilation and reflects a contemporary trend of rustic regionalism. In this building, elements from the colonial past have been freely employed. The facade articulation, proportioning system, symmetricity, monumentality etc. in this building represent a modernized version of colonial architecture - a symbol of imperial power.
