= Mirza Abbas =

Bangladeshi politician (born 1951)

- মির্জা আব্বাস
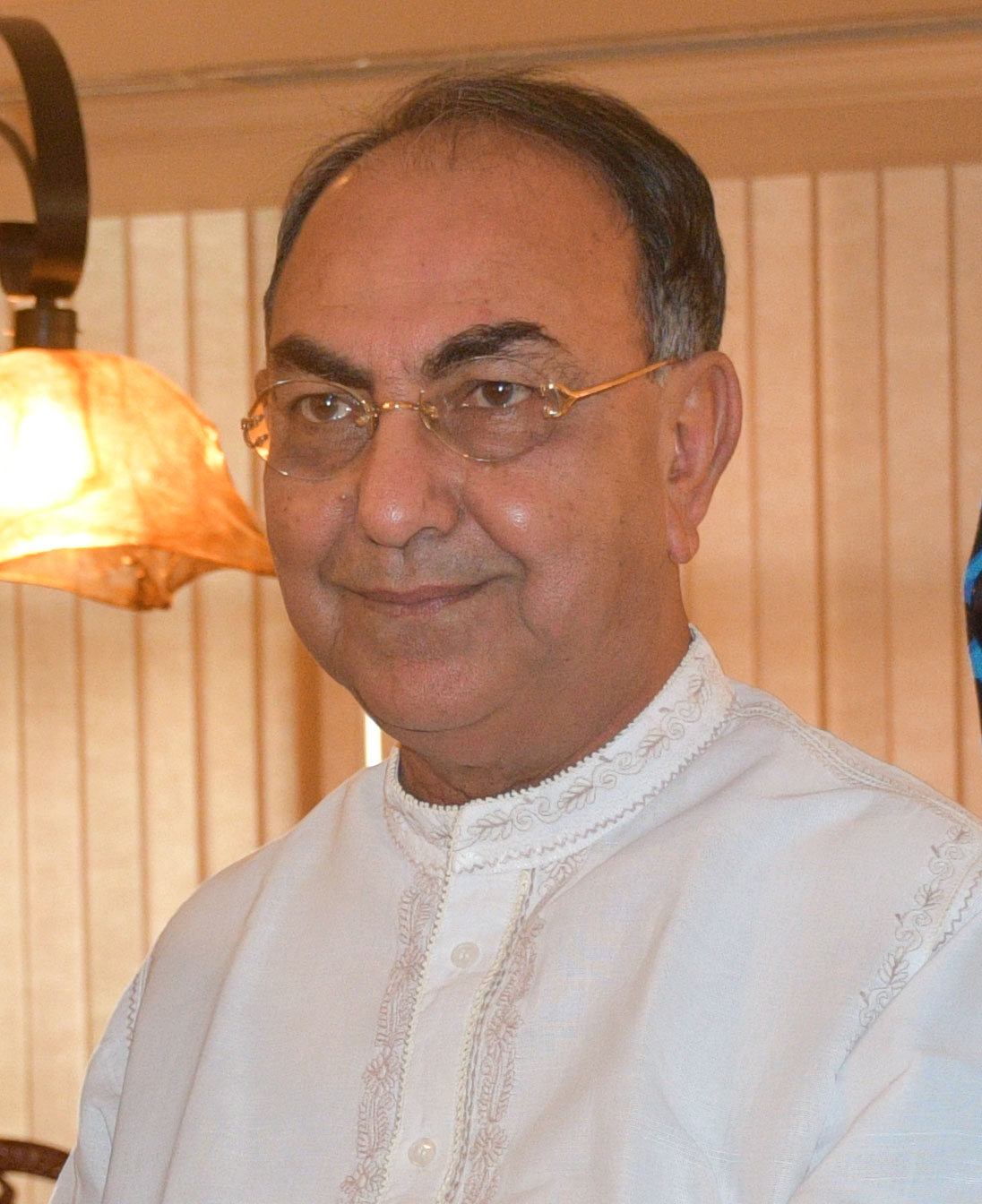
- Abbas in 2020

Adviser to the Prime Minister of Bangladesh
- Incumbent
- Assumed office 17 February 2026
- Prime Minister: Tarique Rahman

Member of Parliament
- Incumbent
- Assumed office 17 February 2026
- Preceded by: AFM Bahauddin Nasim
- Constituency: Dhaka-8
- In office 1 October 2001 – 28 October 2006
- Preceded by: Saber Hossain Chowdhury
- Succeeded by: Mizanur Rahman Khan
- Constituency: Dhaka-6
- In office 20 March 1991 – 30 March 1996
- Preceded by: Abdur Rahim
- Succeeded by: Saber Hossain Chowdhury
- Constituency: Dhaka-6

Minister of Housing and Public Works
- In office 10 October 2001 – 29 October 2006
- Prime Minister: Khaleda Zia
- Preceded by: Abdul Muyeed Chowdhury
- Succeeded by: Dhiraj Kumar Nath

5th Mayor of Dhaka
- In office 13 December 1990 – 11 March 1994
- Preceded by: Abul Hasnat
- Succeeded by: Mohammad Hanif

Minister of State for Youth and Sports
- In office 20 March 1991 – 17 May 1991
- Prime Minister: Khaleda Zia
- Succeeded by: Sadeque Hossain Khoka

Personal details
- Born: 7 February 1951 (age 75) Kishoreganj, East Pakistan
- Party: Bangladesh Nationalist Party
- Spouse: Afroza Abbas
- Occupation: Politician

Mirza Abbas Uddin Ahmed (Bengali: মির্জা আব্বাস উদ্দিন আহমেদ; born 7 February 1951) is a politician of the Bangladesh Nationalist Party and a member of the national standing committee of the party. He is an adviser to the prime minister of Bangladesh, Tarique Rahman with the rank of minister. He was the 5th mayor of Dhaka from 1990 to 1994. He was the member of parliament (MP) for Dhaka-6 from 2001 to 2006 and Minister of Housing and Public Works in Khaleda's cabinet. He is currently the MP for Dhaka-8, after defeating Nasiruddin Patwary in the 2026 Bangladeshi general election.

== Early life and career ==
Mirza Abbas Uddin Ahmed was born on 7 February 1951 to a Bengali family of Muslim Mirzas in Kishoreganj, then part of the Mymensingh district of East Bengal, Pakistan. He was a son of Mirza Abdur Razzaq and Kamala Khatun. After completing his initial schooling within Kishoreganj, he enrolled at the Nazimuddin Bhuiyan Degree College in Madanpur, Bandar in 1966, graduating with a Bachelor of Commerce degree in 1972.

== Political career ==
Abbas was appointed as the mayor of Dhaka City Corporation in 1991. He served at that position until December 1993. Later, in the election of 2001, Mirza Abbas was elected as a member of parliament from capital Dhaka. He was appointed as the Minister of Housing and Public Works. Mirza Abbas, as a minister, time and again focused on the strict enforcement of Wetland Protection Act to ensure environmental balance and flooding. The Ministry of Housing and Public Works under his able leadership amended the Building Construction Rules that was finally enacted in December 2006.

Under his auspices, the Ministry also formulated Private Housing Land Development Rules, a guideline to streamline real estate developers particularly involved in filling up thousands of acres of wetland and flood flow zones. In The 5th National Council of Bangladesh Nationalist Party of 2009, he was selected as a national standing committee member of the party for his contribution towards the party. He was later given the responsibility of the convener of party's Dhaka city unit in 2014. In 2015, he collected his nomination form to contest as a mayoral candidate from Dhaka South City Corporation.

In 2026, he returned to parliament as MP, after successfully beating NCP politician Nasiruddin Patwary in Dhaka-8.

=== Charges and convictions ===
On 25 February 2007, Abbas was arrested when he went to submit his wealth statement to the Anti-Corruption Commission (ACC). He was among the first list of 50 graft suspects.

On 15 July 2007, ACC filed a case against Abbas, former BNP MP Ali Asgar Lobi and Mahfuzul Islam, a government official. The case accused them of illegally allotting an industrial plot in Tejgaon Industrial Area for Pacific Chemicals Ltd, a company owned by Lobi in 2006.

On 12 May 2008, Abbas was sentenced to 8 years' imprisonment on charges of evading tax upon his income for during 1990–2007 and also, furnishing false information in the tax returns.

On 6 March 2014, ACC filed a graft cast against Abbas over corruption in plot allocation among journalists when he was the housing and public works minister. After a Supreme Court ruling, he was released on bail from jail in April 2016. In 2025, he was acquitted by the court in these cases.

On 6 January 2016, after the surrender, Abbas was jailed in connection with two violence cases. The cases were filed in December 2014 and January 2015. In 2024, he was freed from jail.

Prior to the 2026 general election, rivalry developed between Abbas and Nasiruddin Patwary of the National Citizen Party. Both criticized each other on social media and in public statements, press briefings, and political events, exchanging accusations regarding political credibility. Their exchanges drew significant media and public attention.

== Personal life ==
Abbas is married to Afroza Abbas, the president of Jatiyatabadi Mahila Dal, a wing of the BNP.

== Social service ==
Abbas established the Mirza Abbas Mohila Degree College for the betterment of women education in his locality. He donated to SEID Trust, a school for autistic children.

Order of precedence
Preceded by Mohammed Shahabuddin as former President	Order of precedence of Bangladesh as Cabinet minister	Followed by Nazrul Islam Khan as Cabinet minister
