= Kotwali Thana, Dhaka =

Thana in Dhaka South City Corporation, Bangladesh

Kotwali Thana কোতোয়ালী থানা
- Thana
- Interactive map of Kotwali Thana
- Coordinates: 23.71069°N 90.409°E
- Country: Bangladesh
- Division: Dhaka Division
- District: Dhaka District
- Established as a thana: 1976

Area
  - Total: 0.67 km^{2} (0.26 sq mi)
- Elevation: 23 m (75 ft)

Population (2022)
  - Total: 49,085
  - Density: 92,667/km^{2} (240,010/sq mi)
- Time zone: UTC+6 (BST)
- Postal code: 1100
- Area code: 02

Dhaka Kotwali (Bengali: ঢাকা কোতোয়ালী) is the sadar (principal) thana of Dhaka District in the Dhaka Division, Bangladesh.

== Geography ==
Dhaka Kotwali is bounded by Bangshal Thana to the north, Keraniganj Upazila to the south, Sutrapur Thana to the east, and Chowkbazar Thana to the west. It has total area of 0.67 km^{2}.

== Demographics ==
Religions in Kotwali Thana (2022)
Religion	Percent
Islam	60.90%
Hinduism	38.84%
Other or not stated	0.25%

According to the 2022 Bangladeshi census, Kotwali Thana had 11,137 households and a population of 49,085. 5.04% of the population were under 5 years of age. Kotwali had a literacy rate (age 7 and over) of 91.83%: 91.83% for males and 91.82% for females, and a sex ratio of 147.55 males for every 100 females.

According to the 2011 Census of Bangladesh, Kotwali Thana has a population of 62,087 with an average household size of 5.3 members, and an average literacy rate of 73.0% vs the national average of 51.8% literacy.

== Points of interest ==
The three-domed Daroga Amir Uddin Mosque lies at the western end of the thana, on the bank of the Buriganga River next to the Babubazar Bridge.

== See also ==
- Upazilas of Bangladesh
- Districts of Bangladesh
- Divisions of Bangladesh
