= Chawkbazar Thana, Dhaka =

Thana in Dhaka, Bangladesh

Chawkbazar চকবাজার
- Thana
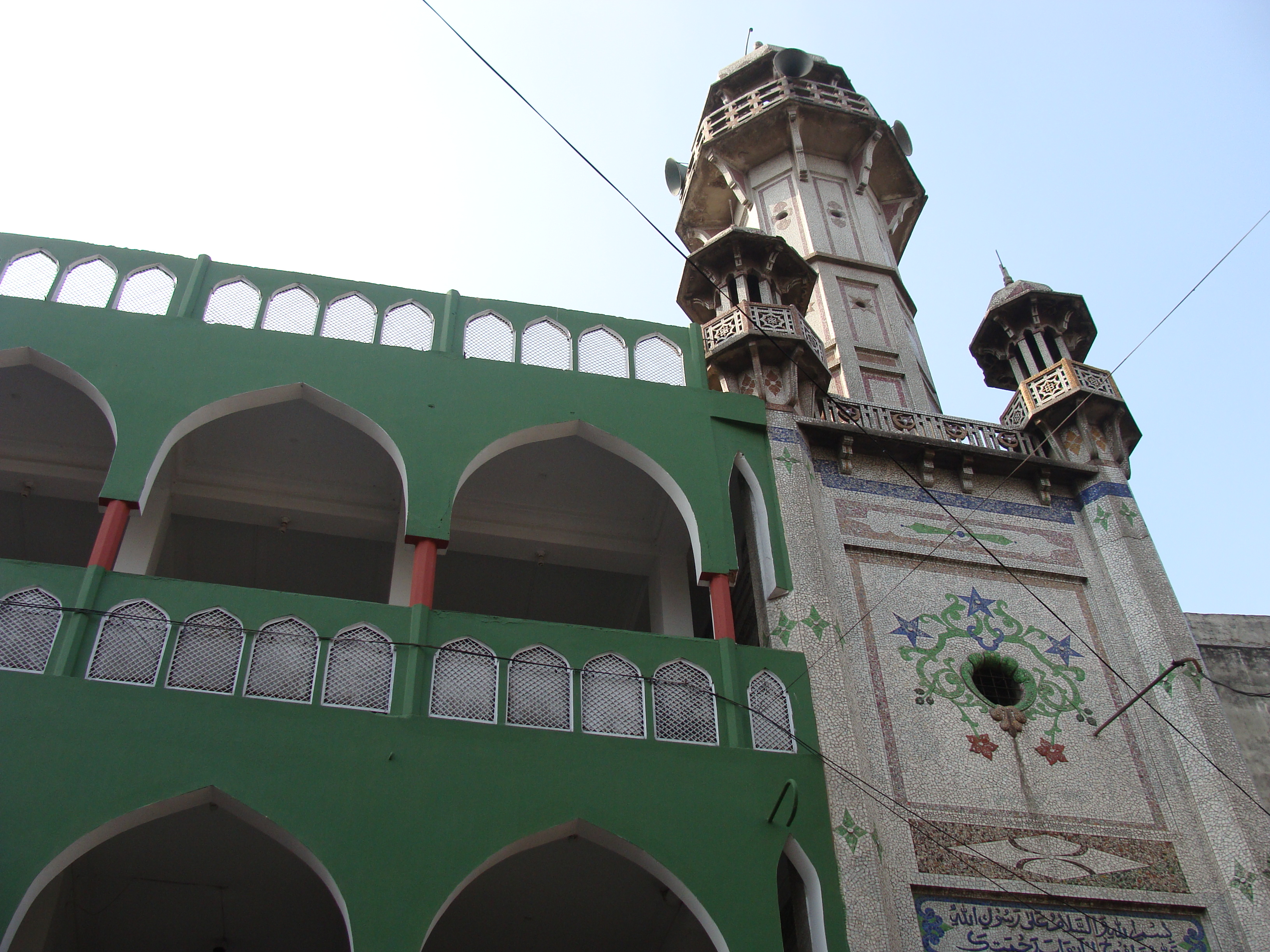
- Front face of Chawkbazar Mosque
- Interactive map of Chawkbazar
- Location of Chawkbazar within Dhaka Location of Chawkbazar within Dhaka Division Location of Chawkbazar within Bangladesh
- Coordinates: 23.717036°N 90.396322°E
- Country: Bangladesh
- Division: Dhaka Division
- District: Dhaka District

Area
  - Total: 2.07 km^{2} (0.80 sq mi)

Population (2022)
  - Total: 123,053
  - Density: 75,433/km^{2} (195,370/sq mi)
- Time zone: UTC+6 (BST)
- Postal code: 1211
- Area code: 02

Chawkbazar (Bengali: চকবাজার), also called Chawkbazar Model Thana, is a Thana of Dhaka District in the Division of Dhaka, Bangladesh. It was formed in August 2009 from parts of Lalbagh Thana and Kotwali Thana, and has an area of 2.07 km^{2}. It includes the Chowk Bazaar and was the site of the February 2019 Dhaka fire, that left scores of people dead.

== History ==
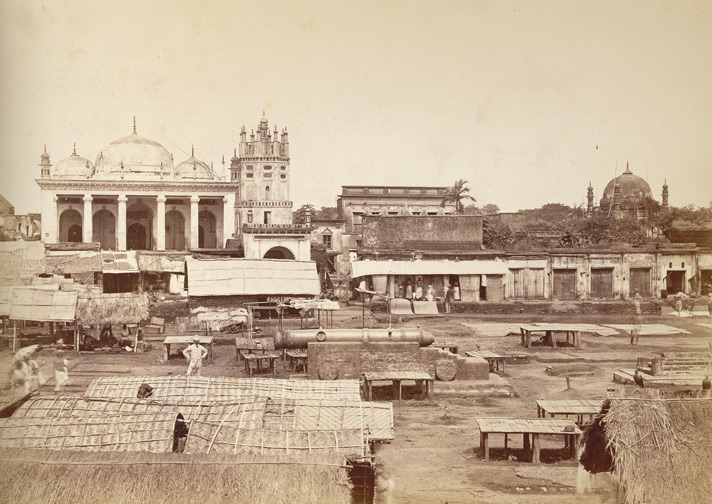
General view of the market place, 1885. Picture shows the Bibi Mariam Cannon

Chowkbazar (also spelled, Chawk Bazaar) is known as a sprawling market area in Dhaka, Bangladesh, with hundreds of shops, market stalls and vendors. In 1702, Murshid Quli Khan established the market, naming it Badshahi Bazar, which was later renamed as Chawk Bazaar.

Later, James Taylor in his 1840 book, "A Sketch of the Topography & Statistics of Dacca" left a description of Chawkbazar: "It is a square of pretty large dimensions, and is surrounded chiefly by mosques and shops. The open space, in which the bazar is held, is enclosed by a low wall, with a carriage road around it."

== Demographics ==
Religions in Chakbazar Thana (2022)
Religion	Percent
Islam	97.53%
Hinduism	2.37%
Other or not stated	0.10%

According to the 2022 Bangladeshi census, Chakbazar Thana had 31,677 households and a population of 123,053. 6.70% of the population were under 5 years of age. Chakbazar had a literacy rate (age 7 and over) of 86.10%: 86.66% for males and 85.33% for females, and a sex ratio of 135.54 males for every 100 females.

According to the 2011 Census of Bangladesh, Chak Bazar Thana had 25,401 households with an average household size of 4.58 and a population of 156,147. Males constituted 64.69% (101,016) of the population while females 35.31% (55,131). Chak Bazar Thana had a literacy rate (age 7 and over) of 70.4%, compared to the national average of 51.8%, and a sex ratio of 183.There were 457 floating people in this jurisdiction.

== Notable landmarks ==
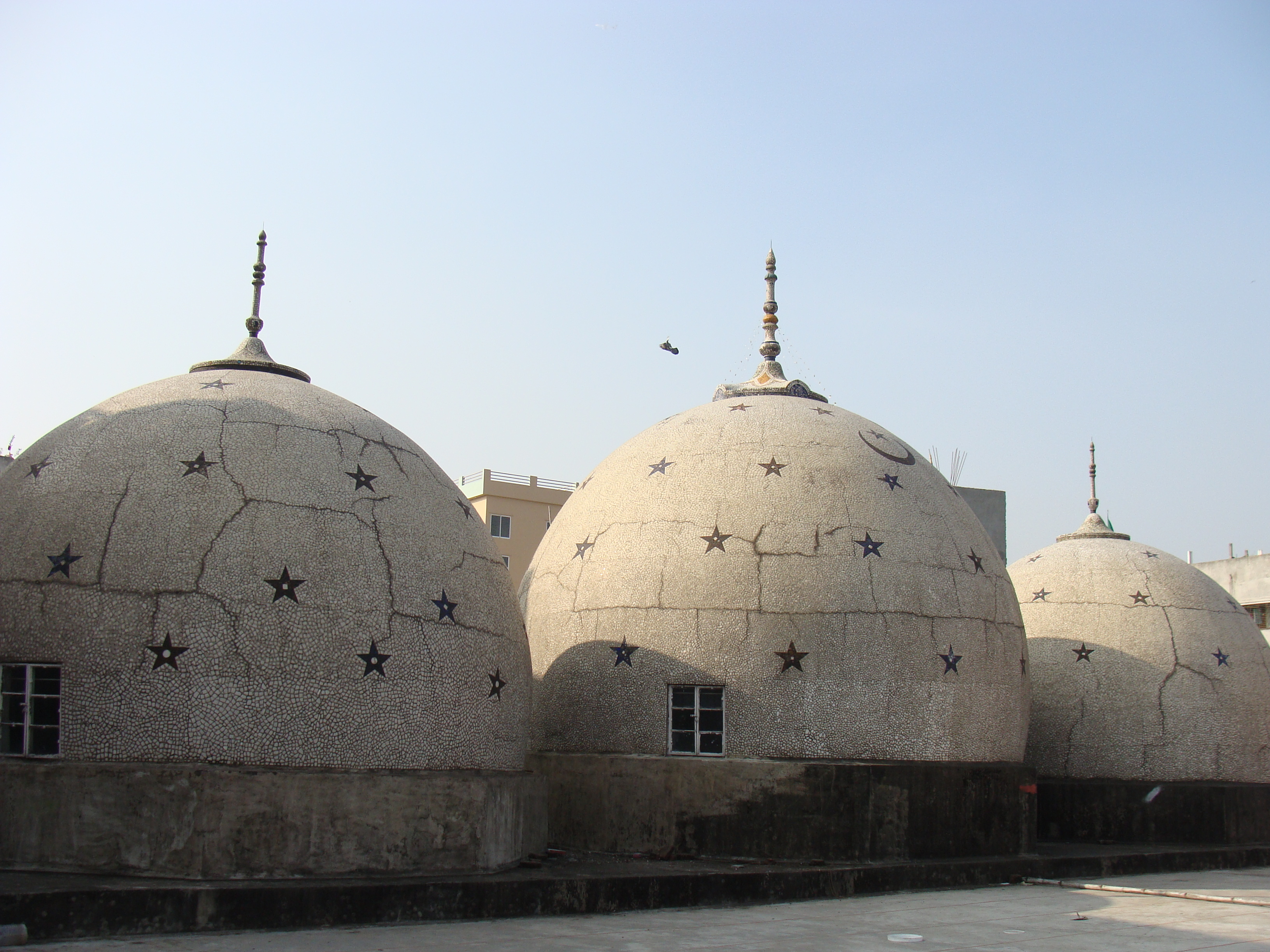
The Chawk Mosque is a notable landmark of Chowkbazar Thana.

Beside the market square is Chawk Mosque, built by Shaista Khan in 1676. It is 94 feet long, 80 feet wide and has three domes. Other notable landmarks include: Hussaini Dalan (1642), Bara Katra (1641), Choto Katra (1663) and Dhakeshwari Temple (1890).

== See also ==
- Upazilas of Bangladesh
- Districts of Bangladesh
- Divisions of Bangladesh
