= Bangsal Thana =

Thana in Dhaka South City Corporation, Bangladesh

Bangsal বংশাল
- Thana
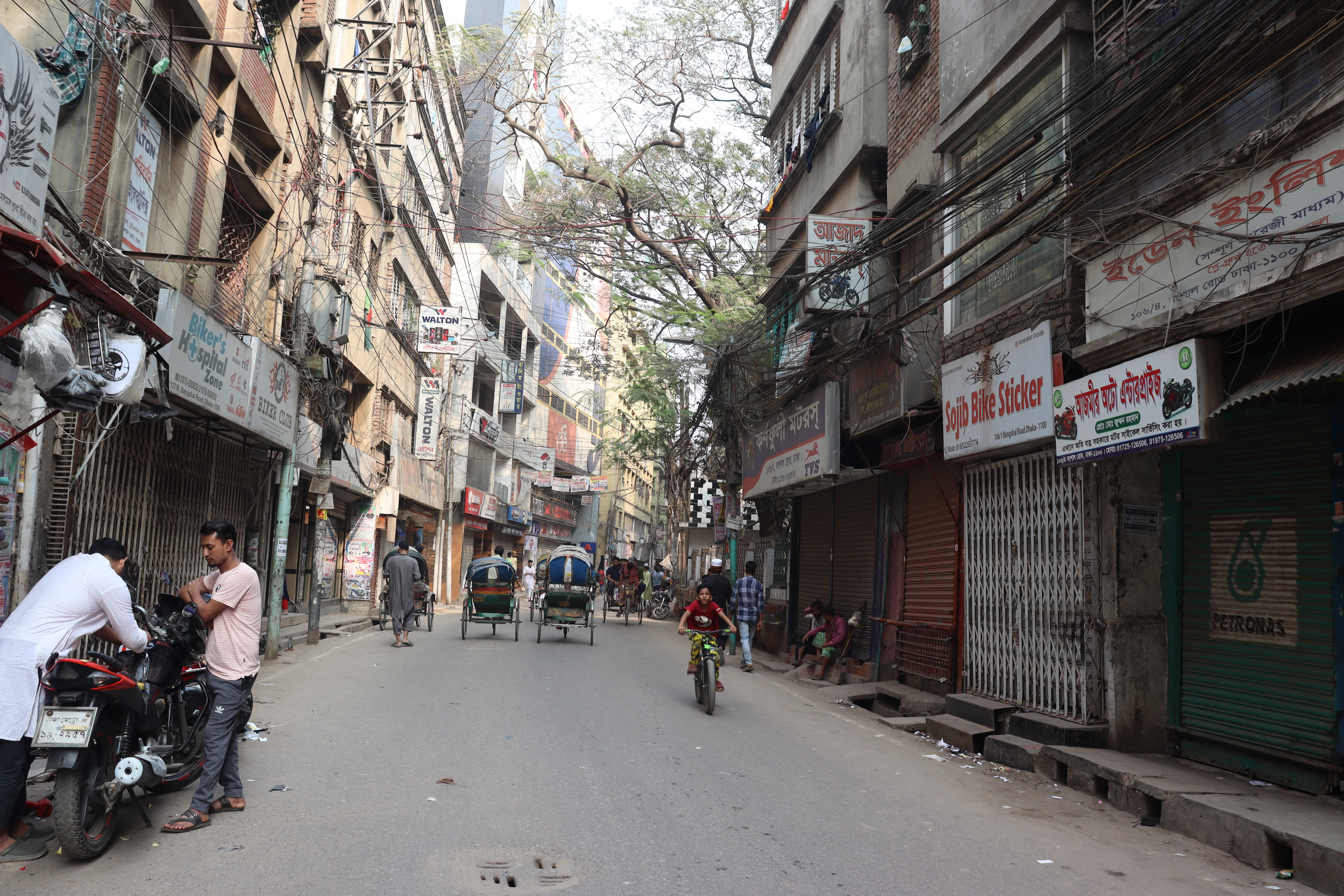
- Bangshal Road
- Interactive map of Bangsal
- Location of Bangshal within Dhaka Location of Bangshal within Dhaka Division Location of Bangshal within Bangladesh
- Country: Bangladesh
- Division: Dhaka Division
- District: Dhaka District

Area
  - Total: 1.2 km^{2} (0.46 sq mi)
- Elevation: 23 m (75 ft)

Population (2022)
  - Total: 176,025
  - Density: 155,793/km^{2} (403,500/sq mi)
- Time zone: UTC+6 (BST)
- Postal code: 1100
- Area code: 02

Bangsal (Bengali: বংশাল) is a Thana of Dhaka District in the Division of Dhaka, Bangladesh. It was formed in September 2009 from part of Kotwali Thana.

== Demographics ==
Religions in Bangshal Thana (2022)
Religion	Percent
Islam	95.23%
Hinduism	4.73%
Other or not stated	0.04%

According to the 2022 Bangladeshi census, Bangshal Thana had 42,816 households and a population of 176,026. 6.02% of the population were under 5 years of age. Bangshal had a literacy rate (age 7 and over) of 84.95%: 84.76% for males and 85.27% for females, and a sex ratio of 154.82 males for every 100 females.

According to the 2011 Census of Bangladesh, Bangshal Thana had 35,410 households with an average household size of 4.95 and a population of 186,952. Males constituted 64.39% (120,382) of the population, while females constituted 35.61% (66,570). Bangshal Thana had a literacy rate (age 7 and over) of 73.0%, compared to the national average of 51.8%, and a sex ratio of 181. There were 923 floating people in this jurisdiction.

== Points of interest ==
- Koshaituli Mosque, built in 1919, blends pre-Mughal and Mughal architectural styles. Rectangular in plan, it has three fluted onion domes, the middle one larger than those on either side, and multifoiled or cusped arches. Decorated in 1971, it is one of the most ornate mosques in Old Dhaka. Its entire surface is covered with mosaics made from broken bits of ceramic and glass that form geometric and floral designs and calligraphic inscriptions.

== Gallery ==
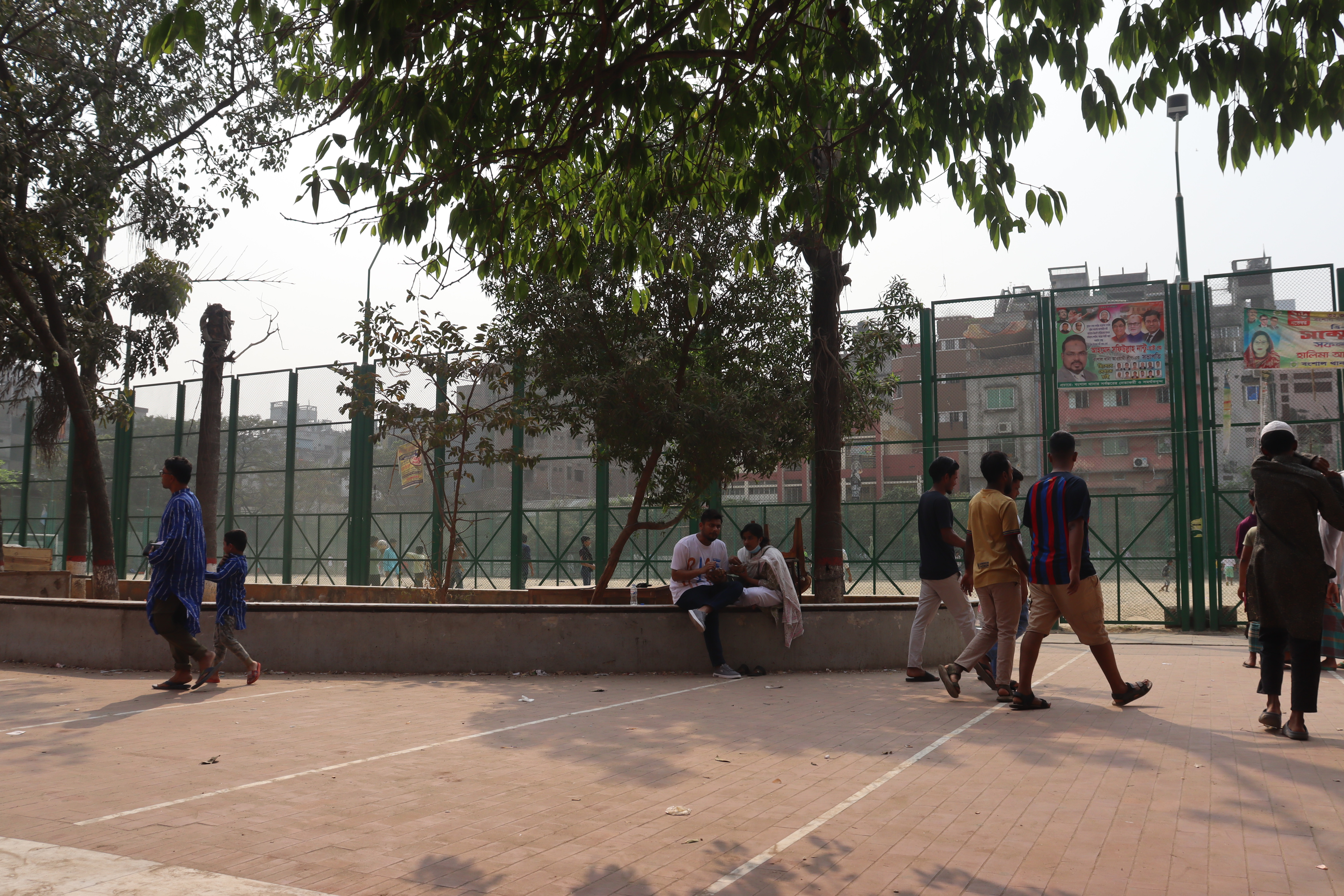
Bangladesh Math

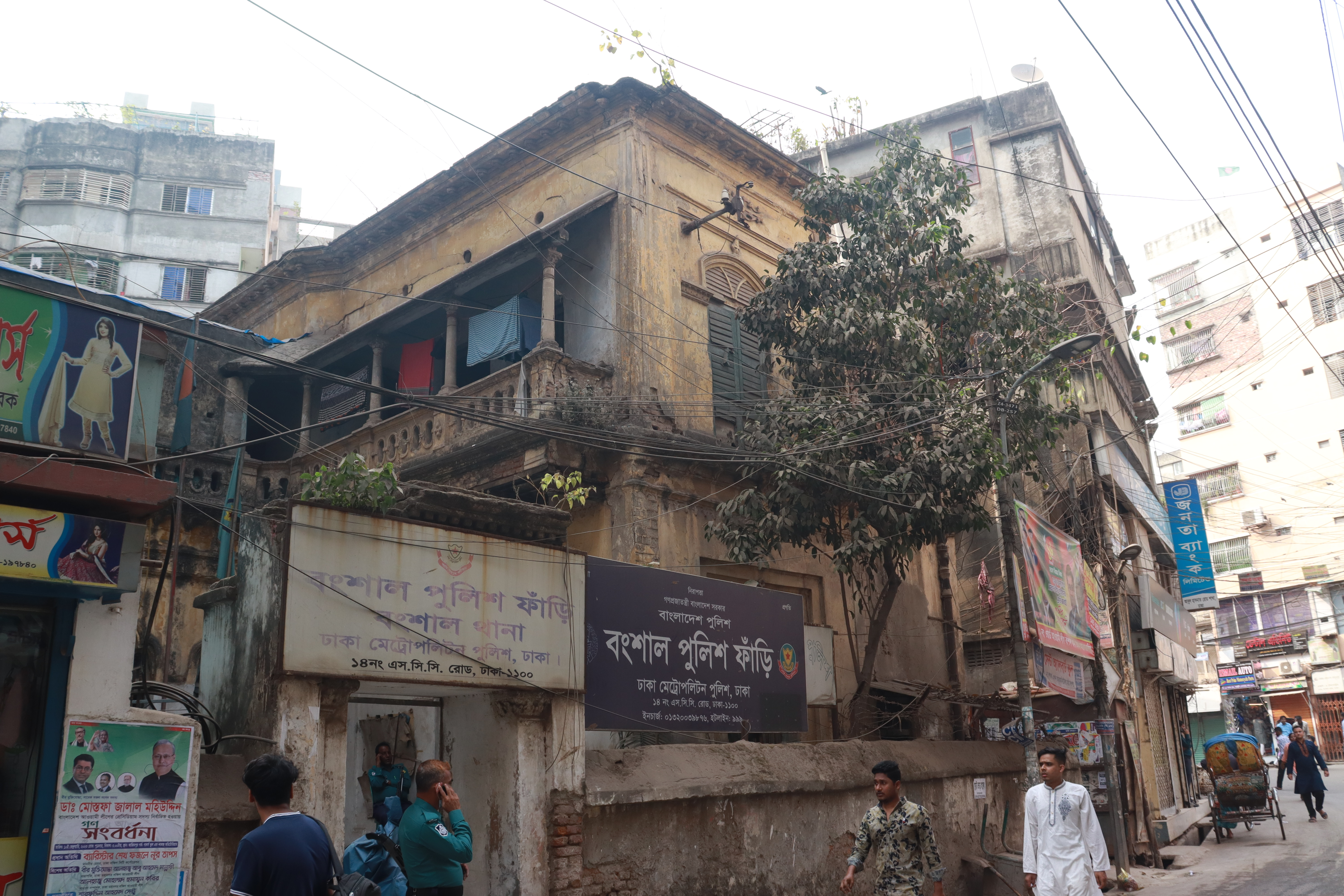
Police station in Bangshal

== See also ==
- Upazilas of Bangladesh
- Districts of Bangladesh
- Divisions of Bangladesh
