= Sheikh Fazle Noor Taposh =

Bangladeshi politician

- শেখ ফজলে নূর তাপস
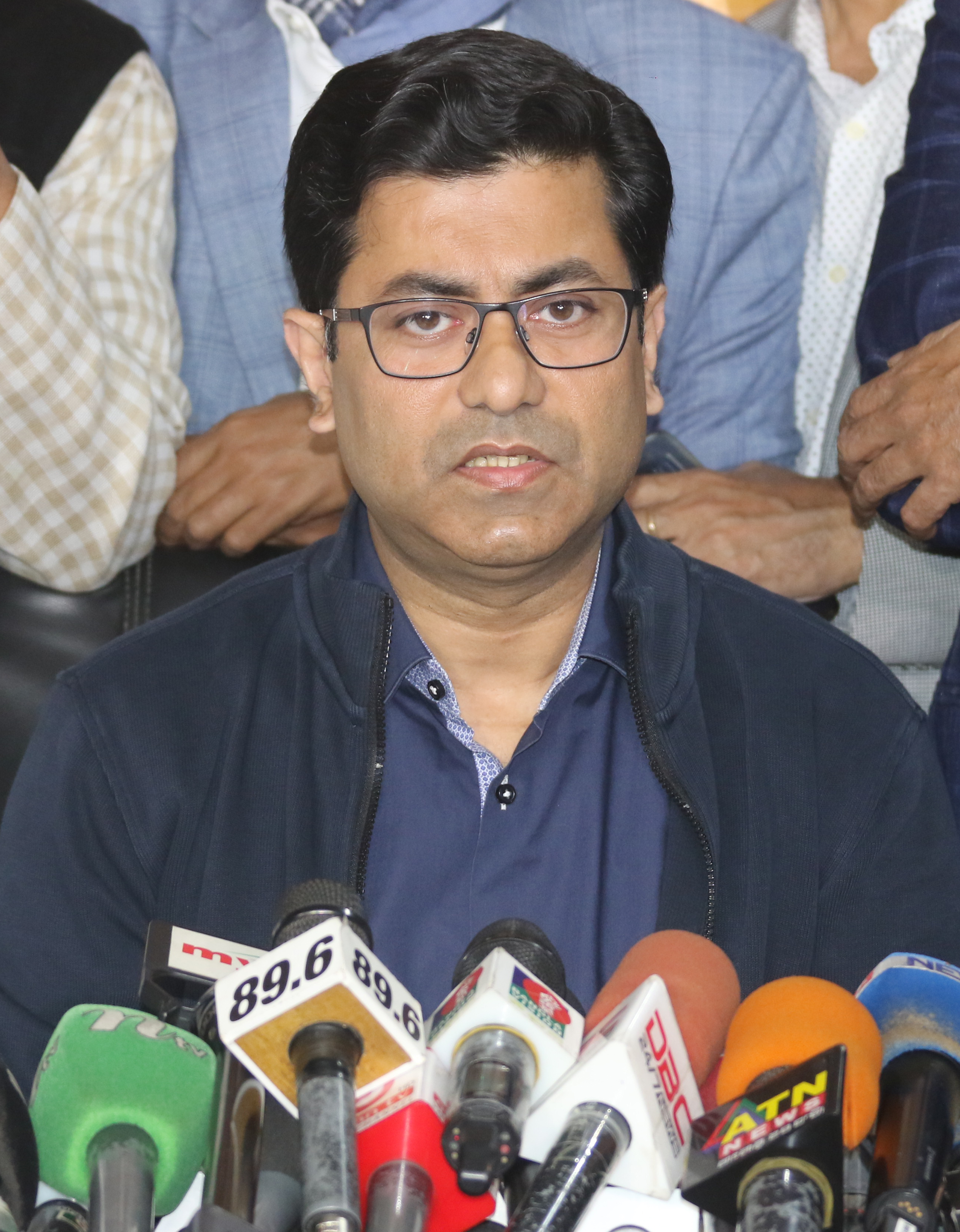
- Taposh in 2020

2nd Mayor of South Dhaka
- In office 16 May 2020 – 19 August 2024
- Preceded by: Sayeed Khokon
- Succeeded by: Mohammad Sher Ali; as Administrator

Member of Parliament
- In office 29 January 2014 – 31 January 2020
- Preceded by: A.K.M. Rahmatullah
- Succeeded by: Shafiul Islam Mohiuddin
- Constituency: Dhaka-10
- In office 25 January 2009 – 24 January 2014
- Preceded by: Dewan Md. Salauddin
- Succeeded by: Asaduzzaman Khan
- Constituency: Dhaka-12

Personal details
- Born: 19 November 1971 (age 54) Dhaka, Bangladesh
- Party: Bangladesh Awami League
- Spouse: Afrin Taposh
- Children: 2
- Parent: Sheikh Fazlul Haque Mani (father)
- Relatives: see Sheikh Family
- Profession: Politician, lawyer

Sheikh Fazle Noor Taposh (born 19 November 1971) is a Bangladeshi politician and former mayor of South Dhaka. Previously, he served as a member of the Bangladesh Parliament for Dhaka-10 and Dhaka-12 from the Bangladesh Awami League. He is a grandnephew of Bangladesh's first president, Sheikh Mujibur Rahman, and a first-cousin nephew of Sheikh Hasina. He reportedly fled from Bangladesh to Singapore on 3 August 2024, just days before the fall of Sheikh Hasina's regime. Since then, he has been charged over a death in custody and with corruption.

== Early life ==
Taposh was born on 19 November 1971 to Awami League leader Sheikh Fazlul Haque Mani and Arzu Moni. His father was a nephew of Bangladesh's first president, Sheikh Mujibur Rahman, making Taposh a grandnephew of Sheikh Mujib and a first cousin once-removed of Sheikh Hasina. His parents were both assassinated on 15 August 1975 in a military coup that also killed Sheikh Mujibur Rahman and other members of his family. Taposh and his elder brother, Sheikh Fazle Shams Parash, survived.

== Career ==
Taposh was elected to the Jatiya Sangsad in the 2008 Bangladeshi general election from the Dhaka-12 constituency.

His vehicle was subjected to a bomb attack on 20 October 2009. The incident resulted in property damage and injuries to thirteen individuals.

In the 2014 general election, he was elected unopposed to represent the Dhaka-10 constituency.

In 2015, his rally was the target of a bomb attack.

In the 2018 election, he was elected a member of parliament for a third consecutive time.

In 2020, he won the Dhaka mayoral election and became the mayor of Dhaka South. He got the status of full minister on 8 August 2022, along with DNCC Mayor Atiqul Islam.

On 19 August 2024, he was removed from the mayor's position by the government.

On 27 March 2025, the court cancelled the gazette notification issued on the result of the 2020 Dhaka South Mayor election, which named him as the DSCC mayor.

== Controversies ==
=== Complicity in BDR mutiny ===
He is widely believed to be one of the orchestrators of the BDR massacre. He has also been sued over the custodial death of a BDR carnage accused.

On 30 November 2025, the commission reinvestigating the BDR massacre reported that the incident was a planned operation, not a spontaneous mutiny, and alleged collective involvement of the Awami League. The report claims that Taposh acted as the main coordinator and that then–Prime Minister Sheikh Hasina gave a "green signal," extending responsibility across political and military leadership. It also notes evidence destruction and missing key individuals during the probe.

=== Corruption and money laundering allegations ===
Taposh had been the main sponsor of Modhumoti Bank, which began its operations in 2013. The source of the funds was said to be from "Tungipara Fisheries", which were reportedly of dubious origin. The purchase of Modhumoti Bank shares catapulted Taposh into the category of the country's super-rich. He serves as a director at the bank.

Soon after becoming the mayor for DSCC in 2020, Taposh signed an agreement with Modhumoti Bank to handle all DSCC's financial transactions. He reportedly pressured DSCC to transfer a significant portion of its fixed deposits and current transactions to the bank. Under his leadership, six booths of the bank were also established within DSCC offices while excluding other banks.

In January 2025, Bangladesh's Anti-Corruption Commission (ACC) charged him with corruption and money laundering of over 539 crore taka. The investigation of the Anti-Corruption Commission (ACC) has revealed that both Sheikh Fazle Noor Taposh and his wife, Afrin Taposh, have adopted illegal methods to launder the earned black money. They also found evidence of his wife amassing hundreds of crores of taka illegally.

=== Complicity in Shapla Square massacre ===
After the July Uprising in 2024, the International Crimes Tribunal set up a probe into the 2013 crackdown and massacre at Shapla Square. The probed named Taposh as a co-accused along with her aunt, the then Prime Minister Sheikh Hasina as the person who directly ordered the massacre.

== Policies ==
Taposh called for the trial of Mahfuz Anam for supporting the military-backed caretaker government. He has criticized the Rapid Action Battalion over extrajudicial killings.
