= Lalbagh Thana =

Thana in Dhaka South City Corporation, Bangladesh

Lalbagh Thana লালবাগ থানা
- Thana
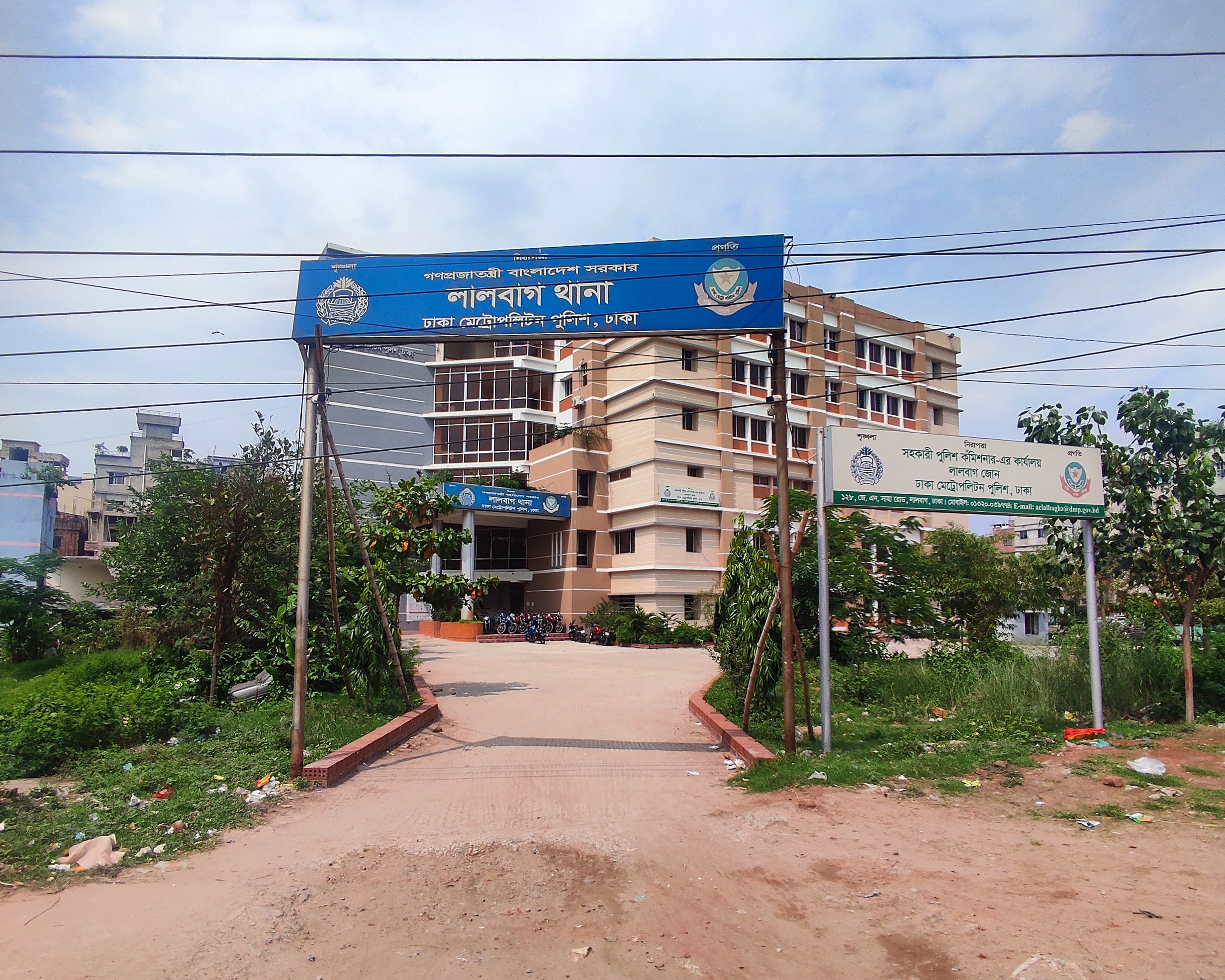
- Lalbagh Thana
- Interactive map of Lalbagh Thana
- Location of Lalbagh Thana within Dhaka Location of Lalbagh Thana within Dhaka Division Location of Lalbagh Thana within Bangladesh
- Coordinates: 23.71984°N 90.38974°E
- Country: Bangladesh
- Division: Dhaka Division
- District: Dhaka District
- Established: 1900

Area
  - Total: 2.04 km^{2} (0.79 sq mi)
- Elevation: 23 m (75 ft)

Population (2022)
  - Total: 369,933
  - Density: 181,000/km^{2} (470,000/sq mi)
- Time zone: UTC+6 (BST)
- Postal code: 1211
- Area code: 02

Lalbagh (Bengali: লালবাগ, lit. 'Red garden') is a neighbourhood of the Dhaka District in the division of Dhaka, Bangladesh.

== Geography ==
Lalbagh Thana is bounded by New Market Thana on the north, Keraniganj Upazila on the south, Chawkbazar Thana and Shahbagh on the east and Hazaribagh Thana and Keraniganj Upazila on the west. The thana occupies an area of 2.04 square km.

== Demographics ==
According to the 2022 Bangladeshi census, Lalbag Thana had 47,920 households and a population of 186,025. 6.94% of the population were under 5 years of age. Lalbag had a literacy rate (age 7 and over) of 87.57%: 88.34% for males and 86.76% for females, and a sex ratio of 104.14 males for every 100 females.

According to 2011 Census of Bangladesh, Lalbagh Thana has a population of 369,933 with average household size of 4.4 members, and an average literacy rate of 66.1% vs national average of 51.8%.

=== Banks ===
Almost every bank operating in the country has an outlet in Lalbagh.

=== Markets ===
- Chowk Bazaar

Lalbagh Police Station is located at Road No. 17, Shahid Nagar, Dhaka, Bangladesh.
