= Hazaribagh Thana =

Thana in Dhaka South City Corporation, Bangladesh

Hazaribagh Thana হাজারীবাগ থানা
- Thana
- Interactive map of Hazaribagh Thana
- Coordinates: 23.734722°N 90.369444°E
- Country: Bangladesh
- Division: Dhaka Division
- District: Dhaka District

Area
  - Total: 3.6 km^{2} (1.4 sq mi)
- Elevation: 23 m (75 ft)

Population (2022)
  - Total: 200,467
  - Density: 51,854/km^{2} (134,300/sq mi)
- Time zone: UTC+6 (BST)
- Postal code: 1209
- Area code: 02

Hazaribagh (Bengali: হাজারীবাগ) is a Thana of Dhaka District in the Division of Dhaka, Bangladesh. Hazaribagh is part of Old Town, Dhaka, Bangladesh. 95% of Bangladesh's tanneries, which is where animal skins are processed to make leather, were located in or around Hazaribagh before they moved to Hemayatpur, Savar. In Hazaribagh, traditional establishments, culture, language and food can be found in daily life practices. Owing to its location near Buriganga River, Hazaribagh shares significant history as well. It is one of the most densely populated places on earth, though it is criticised for its low living standards.

== Geography ==
Total area of Hazaribagh Thana is 3.58 km^{2}.

== Demographics ==
Religions in Hazaribag Thana (2022)
Religion	Percent
Islam	94.61%
Hinduism	5.27%
Other or not stated	0.12%

According to the 2022 Bangladeshi census, Hazaribag Thana had 53,550 households and a population of 200,476. 7.00% of the population were under 5 years of age. Hazaribag had a literacy rate (age 7 and over) of 86.72%: 87.97% for males and 85.31% for

females, and a sex ratio of 113.24 males for every 100 females.

According to the 2011 Census of Bangladesh, Hazaribagh Thana had 43,740 households and a population of 185,639. Males constituted 54.29% (100,776) of the population while females 45.71% (84,863). Hazaribagh had a literacy rate (age 7 and over) of 67.3%, compared to the national average of 51.8%, and a sex ratio of 119.There were 792 floating people in this jurisdiction.

The religious breakdown was Muslim 95.51% (177,312), Hindu 4.39% (8,151), Christian 0.06% (118), Buddhist 0.03% (57), and others 0.01% (1). The ethnic minority people lived there were 61 in total.

== Administration ==
Hazaribagh has 3 Unions/Wards, 15 Mauzas/Mahallas, and 1 village.

== Schools and colleges ==
- Moneshwar Government Primary School (1964)
- Mukulika High School (1981)
- Shahid Sheikh Rasel Government High School (2011)
- Saleha School And College
- Gojmohal Tannery High School (1988)
- Zigatola High School (1969)
- Zigatola Model Govt Primary School (1966)
- Hazrat Ayesha (R:) Academy
- Institute of Leather Engineering and Technology, University of Dhaka . This is an Institute of the Dhaka University since 2011, It has contain 3 department of Unit-A of Dhaka University.

== See also ==
- Upazilas of Bangladesh
- Districts of Bangladesh
- Divisions of Bangladesh
