= List of heritage sites of Dhaka =

Buildings, structures, areas, and monuments, Bangladesh

This is a list of heritage sites in Dhaka, the capital of Bangladesh. The sites include buildings, structures, areas, and monuments of historic, cultural, aesthetic, scientific, social, and religious significance.

As of September 2025, Bangladesh does not have an official national list of heritage sites. The Department of Archaeology maintains a national register of protected monuments, but the register is incomplete. In Dhaka, the Rajdhani Unnayan Kartripakkha (RAJUK) has published a partial list of heritage buildings and structures, while the Institute of Architects Bangladesh (IAB) has prepared a national inventory of modern heritage sites. Other initiatives include a small-scale list produced by the Hidden Heritage Foundation and surveys conducted by various non-governmental and civil organizations.

The Urban Study Group (USG), an independent conservation initiative, has claimed that Dhaka contains more than 2,200 heritage sites.

== RAJUK's list ==
Heritage buildings and structures of Dhaka are officially designated under the Dhaka Metropolitan Building (Construction, Development, Preservation and Removal) Rules, 2008. According to Rule 61, the Capital Development Authority (RAJUK), with the approval of the Urban Development Committee, recognizes certain buildings and areas as heritage sites on the basis of their historical, aesthetic, scientific, social, or religious significance.

For the purposes of the regulation, a "listed building" includes the main structure, any adjoining structures, and all parts within its defined boundary. No listed building or structure may be demolished, reconstructed, altered, enlarged, or modified without prior approval from the Urban Development Committee.

The most recent list, published by RAJUK in 2020, identifies 74 heritage structures in Dhaka. These are:

List of heritage buildings and structures in Dhaka by RAJUK
⠀⠀⠀⠀Image⠀⠀⠀⠀	Site	Location	Built	Built by	Description
	Binat Bibi Mosque	Narinda 23°42′40″N 90°25′05″E	1457	Bakht Bint Dokhtar-e-Merhamat	Oldest surviving mosque in Dhaka
	Bara Katra	Chowk Bazaar 23°42′53″N 90°23′43″E	1646	On the orders of Shah Shuja, Dewan Mir Abul Qasim	Mughal tavern
	Chhota Katra	Chowk Bazaar 23°42′47″N 90°23′46″E	1671	During Shaista Khan	Mughal tavern
	Lalbagh Fort	Lalbagh 23°43′08″N 90°23′17″E	1680	Muhammad Azam Shah & Shaista Khan	Mughal fort
	Lalbagh Fort's Southeast Torana	Lalbagh Fort 23°43′05″N 90°23′23″E	1680	Muhammad Azam Shah & Shaista Khan	Mughal torana
	Lalbagh Fort's Shahi Mosque	Lalbagh Fort 23°43′08″N 90°23′13″E	1680	Muhammad Azam Shah & Shaista Khan	Mughal mosque
	Lalbagh Fort's Hammam & Diwan-i-Aam	Lalbagh Fort 23°43′08″N 90°23′19″E	1680	Muhammad Azam Shah & Shaista Khan	Mughal hammam & hall
	Lalbagh Fort's Tomb of Bibi Pari	Lalbagh Fort 23°43′08″N 90°23′15″E	1680	Muhammad Azam Shah & Shaista Khan	Mughal tomb
	Dhanmondi Shahi Eidgah	Sat Masjid Rd., Dhanmondi 23°44′35″N 90°22′26″E	1640	On the orders of Shah Shuja, Dewan Mir Abul Qasim	Mughal eidgah
	Nimtali arch	Nimtali 23°43′28″N 90°24′09″E	1766	Naib Nazim of Dhaka Jesarat Khan	Mughal arch or gatehouse
	Dhaka Gate (Mir Jumla Gate)	Doel Square, Dhaka University 23°43′43″N 90°24′00″E	1660 Rebuilt: 1820s Renov. 2024	Mir Jumla II Rebuilt by: Charles Dawes Renovation: DSCC	Mughal gate
	Adjacent to Dhaka Gate Bibi Mariam Cannon (Mir Jumla Cannon)	Dhaka Gate 23°43′43″N 90°24′00″E	1660	Mir Jumla II	Mughal cannon
	Sat Gambuj Mosque	Mohammadpur 23°45′28″N 90°21′33″E	1680	Shaista Khan's son Umid Khan	Mughal mosque
	Unknown Old Tomb	Bashbari, Mohammadpur 23°45′30″N 90°21′36″E	1600s	Unknown	Mughal tomb
	Shahbaz Khan Mosque & Mazar	Ramna 23°43′46″N 90°24′01″E	1679	Hazi Shahbaz	Mughal mosque ও mazar
	Kartalab Khan Mosque (Begumbazar Mosque)	Begumbazar 23°43′01″N 90°23′55″E	1704	Nawab Dewan Murshid Quli Khan (Kartalab Khan)	Mughal mosque There is a baoli in mosque, which appears to be a monument by itself and only one of its kind in Bengal
	Khan Mohammad Mridha Mosque	Lalbagh 23°43′14″N 90°23′07″E	1706	By order of chief of Dhaka Qazi Ibadullah, Khan Mohammad Mridha	Mughal mosque
	Shaista Khan Mosque	Mitford 23°42′45″N 90°24′00″E	1664	Shaista Khan	Mughal mosque
	Musa Khan Mosque	Dhaka University 23°43′36″N 90°24′03″E	1679	Musa Khan's son Diwan Manowar Khan	Mughal mosque
	Gol Talab (Nawab Bari Pukur)	Islampur 23°42′35″N 90°24′18″E	1610	Nawab Abdul Bari	Mughal pond
	Holy Rosary Church (Tejgaon Church)	Tejgaon 23°45′32″N 90°23′32″E	1677	Portuguese Augustinian missionaries	Mughal era church
	Christian cemetery (Wari cemetery)	Wari 23°42′56″N 90°25′12″E	1600s	Portuguese merchant community	Mughal era christian cemetery
	Christian cemetery's Columbo Sahib Tomb	Christian cemetery 23°42′56″N 90°25′12″E	1700s	Well Wishers of Columbo Sahib	Unknown tomb
	Christian cemetery's Joseph Paget Tomb	Christian cemetery 23°42′54″N 90°25′11″E	1724	Well Wishers of Joseph Paget	Burial of Joseph Paget
	Hussaini Dalan (Imambara)	Bakshibazar 23°43′21″N 90°23′52″E	1642	Shah Shuja Funding: Syed Mirza Murad	Mughal husayniyya
	Dhakeshwari Temple	Orphanage Rd., Lalbagh 23°43′23″N 90°23′23″E	1100s	Ballala Sena	Sena temple
	Joy Kali Temple & Ram Sita Temple	BCC Rd., Thatari Bazar 23°43′18″N 90°25′00″E	1593	Dewan Shri Tulsi Narayan Ghosh, Shri Nava Narayan Ghosh (Under orders of Sadhu Bancharam)	Sultanate era temple
	Gurdwara Nanak Shahi	Dhaka University 23°44′01″N 90°23′37″E	Start: 1600s End: 1830	Sikh preacher Bhainath (alternately Almast)	Historic gurdwara
	Armenian Church	Armanitola 23°42′45″N 90°24′08″E	1781	Armenian community in Old Dhaka	Historic church
	Azimpur Dayera Sharif Khanqah (Boro Dayera Sharif)	Azimpur, Dhaka 23°43′29.9″N 90°22′57.7″E	1766	Shah Sufi Syed Muhammad Dayem	Sufi lodge & Dargah
	Star Mosque (Tara Masjid)	Armanitola 23°42′56″N 90°24′06″E	1860	Mirza Ghulam Pir (Mirza Ahmad Jan)	British era mosque
	Bangshal Ahle Hadith Mosque (Bangshal Boro Masjid)	Bangshal Rd. 23°43′02″N 90°24′26″E	1880	Zamindar Haji Badruddin (Bhutto Haji)	British era mosque
	Sri Sri Bura Shivdham (Shibbari)	Dhaka University 23°43′46″N 90°23′46″E	1600s	Unknown	Mughal era temple
	Northbrook Hall (Lalkuthi)	Farashganj 23°42′16″N 90°24′45″E	1879	Bhawal Raja Rajendra Narayan Roy Chowdhury	British town hall
	Qassabtuly Mosque (Koshaituly Jam-e-Masjid) (Sugar Cube Mosque)	Koshaiituly 23°42′58″N 90°24′18″E	1907	Abdul Bari Bepari	Most decorated mosque in Dhaka. Built during british period. Built with chinitikori mosaic
	St Thomas Church (Church of Bangladesh)	Johnson Rd. 23°42′37″N 90°24′44″E	1819	Church of Bangladesh Diocese of Dhaka Anglican Communion	Church of Church of Bangladesh
	Holy Cross Church (Saint Gregory's Church)	Luxmibazar 23°42′31″N 90°24′50″E	1868	Archdiocese of Dhaka	British church
	Greek Memorial	TSC, Dhaka University 23°43′54″N 90°23′47″E	1890s or 1815	London-based Greek firm of Ralli Brothers or, priest of St Thomas Church, JM MacDonald	Memorial built in memory of Greek merchants in Dhaka
	Sri Sri Radha Govinda Jiu Temple	Gosaibari, Mill Barrack 23°41′45″N 90°25′17″E	1886	Unknown	British era temple
	Shoshan Mandir and Math (Note: Probably the Postagola Crematorium and adjacent temples)	Banianagar, Sutrapur	Unknown	Unknown	Unknown
	Radha Krishna Temple (Shankhanidhi Temple) (Demolished)	Sutrapur 23°42′56″N 90°24′58″E	1921	Lalmohan Saha	Demolished temple
	Sri Sri Radha Ballabh Jiu Vigraha Temple (Ram Shah's Math) (Ram Shah's Temple)	Amligola, Lalbagh 23°43′15″N 90°22′47″E	1788	Ramsah	Mughal era temple
	Daroga Amir Uddin Mosque (Babubazar Ghat Mosque)	Babubazar 23°42′36″N 90°24′10″E	1840	Daroga Amir Uddin	British era mosque
	Gaudiya Madhava Matha	Narinda 23°42′50″N 90°25′08″E	1921	Bhaktisiddhanta Sarasvati	Gaudiya Math of Gaudiya Vaishnavism
	Ramakrishna Mission Temple	Gopibag 23°43′15″N 90°25′25″E	1916	Ramakrishna Mission Funding: Zamindar Yogesh Chandra Das	Ramakrishna Mission branch
	Dilkusha Jame Mosque (Nawabbari Mosque)	Dilkusha, Motijheel 23°43′37″N 90°24′56″E	1474	Shah Jalal Dakhini	Sultanate era mosque
	Dewanbari Mosque	Aminbazar 23°47′25″N 90°19′31″E	1880	Haji Janab Ali	British mosque
	Bahadur Shah Park (Victoria Park)	Sadarghat 23°42′33″N 90°24′44″E	1790s	Armenian community in Old Dhaka	Historic park & maidan
	Bahadur Shah Park Water Tank (Victoria Water Tank)	Johnson Rd. 23°42′36″N 90°24′45″E	1878	British Dhaka Municipal Office	1st overhead water tank of Dhaka
	Ambar Shah Mosque	Kawran Bazar 23°45′08″N 90°23′35″E	1680	Shaista Khan's head eunuch, Khawaja Amber	Mughal mosque There once was a bridge named Khawaja Ambar pul.
	Beraid Bhuyanpara Jame Mosque	Beraid, Badda 23°48′06″N 90°28′39″E	1505	Unknown	Sultanate era mosque
	Shree Shree Siddheswari Kalimandir (Kalibari)	Siddheswari 23°44′38″N 90°24′41″E	1441	Chand Roy	Sultanate era temple
	Archbishop's House (Kakrail Church)	Kakrail 23°44′13″N 90°24′19″E	1913	Archdiocese of Dhaka	Residence of archbishop of Dhaka of Catholic Church'
	Laxmi Narayan Mandir	Patla Khan Rd., Kotwali, Dhaka 23°42′57″N 90°24′42″E	1650	Unknown	Mughal era temple
	Brahmo Samaj Temple	Loyal St., Patuatuli 23°42′28″N 90°24′35″E	1866	Dinanath Sen	Brahmo Samaj temple
	Raja Ram Mohan Roy Library; Old building	Loyal St., Patuatuli 23°42′27″N 90°24′38″E	1871	East Bengal Brahmo Samaj	1st library in Dhaka
	Ruplal House	Farashganj 23°42′13″N 90°24′49″E	1825 Renov.: 1840	Construction: Armenian businessman Stephen Aratun Renov.: Ruplal Das and Raghunath Das	British era palace
	Ahsan Manzil	Islampur 23°42′31″N 90°24′22″E	Andar Mahal: 1730 1859	Andar Mahal: French Traders Main building: Khwaja Abdul Ghani	British era palace
	Wise house (Bafa Building)	Wiseghat 23°42′27″N 90°24′27″E	1800s	Nicholas Pogose or, Josiah Patrick Wise	British era palace
	Burdwan House	Dhaka University area 23°43′46″N 90°23′50″E	1905	British Government	British era palace
	Rose Garden Palace	Tikatuli 23°43′05″N 90°25′35″E	1931	Hrishikesh Das	British era mansion and garden
	Manuk House (Manook House)	Bangabhaban 23°43′28″N 90°25′02″E	1800s	Armenian zamindar Manuk. Renov.: Khwaja Abdul Ghani	British era palace
	Ramna Racecourse Gallery (Suhrawardy Udyan)	Ramna 23°43′56″N 90°23′49″E	1825	Magistrate of Dhaka Charles Dawesm Khwaja Alimullah	British Park
	Swamibag ISKCON Temple; Old buildings	Dayaganj, Narinda 23°42′49″N 90°25′21″E	1899	Tridandi Tripuralingaswami Maharaj	British era temple
	Vice-chancellor House	Dhaka University 23°43′58″N 90°23′31″E	1905	British Government	British palace
	Madhur Canteen	Dhaka University 23°43′54″N 90°23′33″E	1873	Khwaja Ahsanullah	British era dance hall Later Restaurant
	Old High Court Building	Ramna 23°43′46″N 90°24′08″E	1905	British Government	British palace
	Chummery House	Topkhana Rd. 23°43′47″N 90°24′19″E	1920	British Government	British palace
	Twin Shiva Temple (Hindu Matha, TSC)	TSC Complex,Dhaka University 23°43′53″N 90°23′44″E	1800s	Unknown	British temple
	Curzon Hall	Dhaka University 23°43′38″N 90°24′07″E	1904	British Government	British hall
	Baldha Garden	Wari 23°43′06″N 90°25′04″E	1909	Narayan Chandra Chowdhury	1st Botanical garden of Dhaka
	Jatiya Sangsad Bhaban & Sher-e-Bangla Nagar Complex	Sher-e-Bangla Nagar 23°45′44″N 90°22′43″E	Start: 1961 End: 1982	Government of Pakistan Architect: Louis Kahn & Muzharul Islam	National Parliament of Bangladesh
	Fine Arts Building (Art College Building)	Dhaka University 23°44′09″N 90°23′43″E	1956	Dhaka University Architect: Muzharul Islam	Faculty of Dhaka University
	Dhaka University central Library	Dhaka University 23°44′01″N 90°23′42″E	1921	Dhaka University Architect: Muzharul Islam	Dhaka University Library
	Kamalapur railway station	Kamalapur 23°43′55″N 90°25′34″E	1968	Government of East Pakistan Architect: Daniel Dunham & Robert Boughey	Central train station of Dhaka
	Shaheed Minar	Dhaka University 23°43′38″N 90°23′48″E	1963 Renov.: 1972	Government of East Pakistan Architect: Hamidur Rahman & Novera Ahmed	1952 Language movement memorial
	Martyred Intellectuals Memorial, Mirpur	Mirpur 23°47′42″N 90°20′43″E	1972	Government of Bangladesh Architect: Mustafa Harun Quddus Hali	Memorial of Bangladesh Liberation War
	Martyred Intellectuals Memorial	Rayer Bazaar 23°45′03″N 90°21′26″E	1999	Genaration 71 Architect: Farid Uddin Ahmed & Md Jami-al-Shafi	Memorial of Bangladesh Liberation War
	Bangabandhu Memorial Museum	Dhanmondi 23°45′06″N 90°22′36″E	1966	Public Works Department, Government of East Pakistan	Residence of Sheikh Mujibur Rahman
	RAJUK Bhaban (Old DIT)	Dilkusha 23°43′35″N 90°24′57″E	1956	Government of East Pakistan Architect: Abdulhusein M. Thariani	RAJUK office
	Nagar Bhaban (Dhaka South City Corporation)	Gulistan 23°43′26″N 90°24′31″E	1995	Government of Bangladesh Architect: A. Imamuddin & Lailun Nahar Ikram	Dhaka South City Corporation office

== Structures removed from RAJUK's list ==
The first official list of heritage building and structures, published in 2009, identified 93 buildings in Dhaka. In 2017, 18 of these were removed, leaving a revised list of 75 buildings. A further change was made in 2020, when the 150-year-old Government Employees Hospital was excluded to allow for its demolition, reducing the total to 74 buildings.

These removed 19 sites are:

Dhaka's heritage buildings and structures removed from RAJUK's list in 2020 and 2017
⠀⠀⠀⠀Image⠀⠀⠀⠀	Site	Location	Built	Built by	Description
	Government Employees' Hospital (Old Railway Hospital) (Demolished)	Fulbaria 23°43′31″N 90°24′18″E	1885	British government	Demolished hospital building
	Buckland Bund	Sadarghat 23°41′13″N 90°23′49″E	1864	Charles Thomas Buckland	Historic embankment
	Sir Salimullah Medical College; Old 3 buildings	Mitford Rd. 23°42′41″N 90°24′04″E	1875, 1889	Robert Mitford	Historic hospital buildings
	Shankhanidhi House	Tipu Sultan Rd. 23°42′56″N 90°24′58″E	1921	Lalmohan Saha	Historic residence
	St. Gregory's High School & College	Luxmibazar 23°42′30″N 90°24′52″E	1882	Belgian benedictine priest Gregory De Groote	British era school
	Pogose School	Shankhari Bazaar 23°42′34″N 90°24′37″E	1848	Nicholas Pogose	1st private school in Dhaka
	Sushila Cottage (Sushila Kutir)	Nayabazar	Unknown	Unknown	Unknown
	Jagannath University; Administrative building	Liaquat Ave. 23°42′32″N 90°24′37″E	1909	Jagannath College Trust Funding: Sir Robert Nathan	British era college building
	Fazlul Huq Muslim Hall	Dhaka University 23°43′33″N 90°24′12″E	1940	Dhaka University	Historic dorm of DU
	Salimullah Muslim Hall	Dhaka University 23°43′46″N 90°23′27″E	1913	British Government	Historic dorm of DU
	Jagannath Hall old buildings	Dhaka University 23°43′48″N 90°23′37″E	1913	British Government	Historic dorm of DU
	Rashid Bhavan (Registrar Building)	BUET 23°43′33″N 90°23′36″E	1930	BUET	British era college building
	Building No. 28, Utsav Poddar Lane	Sutarnagar	Unknown	Unknown	Unknown
	Building 7–9, Kailash Ghosh Lane	Kotwali	Unknown	Unknown	Unknown
	Building 8.8/1.8/2, Jhulan Bari Lane	Jhulan Bari	Unknown	Unknown	Unknown
	Foreign Affairs Ministry Building (Old Commissioner Building)	Segunbagicha 23°43′49″N 90°24′18″E	British era	British Government	
	Former Education Extension Centre (present-day NAEM)	Behind Dhaka College 23°44′10″N 90°22′49″E	1959	Government of East Pakistan	
	Dhaka Medical College and Hospital; Former Arts Building, Hospital Building, Gate House	Secretariat Rd. 23°43′33″N 90°23′53″E	1946	British Government	British college buildings
	House No.-301-B (Old), Road-24 (Old)	Dhanmondi Residencial Area	Unknown	Unknown	Unknown

== Roads and areas removed from RAJUK's list ==
In addition to individual buildings, the 2009 list designated 13 sites, 10 roads, and 3 areas as heritage. However, all of these were removed from the revised list in 2017. These are:

RAJUK's heritage areas of Dhaka (including settlements, buildings, roads, lanes, open spaces) removed in 2017
⠀⠀⠀⠀Image⠀⠀⠀⠀	Road/ Area	Location	Description
Farashganj area
	Hrishikesh Das Road	Sutrapur 23°42′35″N 90°25′03″E	Hrishikesh Das paid for the electric lighting of the road from Municipal Street to Narinda Pool. Hence this part of Walter Road is named Hrishikesh Das Road. On both sides of Hrishikesh Das Road are numerous British buildings, some over a hundred years old. These houses feature semi-circular arches, stained glass windows, parapets decorated with creepers and beautiful verandas supported by metal or wooden pillars. Many houses have open courtyards which can only be seen through a narrow entrance. The Murapara Zamindar family also has a house here. Many Zamindars, whose estates were outside Dhaka, also built their homes here. There are two old temples here, namely the Shrijut Madan Gopal Jiu Vigraha Thakur Mandir and the Shri Shri Sita Nath Jiu Vigraha Mandir. The Hayat Bepari Mosque, established in 1664, is located on this road. The mosque was founded by Hayat Bepari, the builder of the Narinda Bridge. The original form of the mosque is no longer there. It looks similar to the Narinda Binat Bibi Mosque and had a single dome
	Revati Mohan Das Road	Sutrapur 23°42′21″N 90°25′05″E	Sutrapur Jamindar Bari is located here।
	B. K. Dash Road	Farashganj 23°42′06″N 90°24′59″E	A road located near the Buriganga River in the southern part. This road was named after the famous businessman Basant Kumar Das in 1927. This road is mainly a residential area. The elite class of Dhaka used to live here. There are numerous traditional structures on both sides of the road. Historical structures: Puthighar, Sri Sri Priya Vallabhsri Sri Bankubihari Jiu Mandir, Mangalalaya, Bibi Ka Rowja, Baro Bari. The once residential road has now become mainly a commercial area. Due to heavy traffic congestion, the elite residents have left the area. There are many wooden shops here.
	Farashganj Road	Farashganj 23°42′12″N 90°24′53″E	Farashganj was the commercial center of Dhaka French merchants in the 18th century. Northbrook Hall, Sadarghat, Ruplal House is located here।
Shankhari Bazaar area
	Shankhari Bazaar	23°43′08″N 90°24′35″E	The Shankharis arrived in East Bengal during the reign of Ballāla Sena. In the 17th century, during the Mughal rule, the Shankharis were brought to Dhaka city by granting them land without rent. The Shankharis came to Dhaka and started living in Shankhari Bazar. The Shankharis' houses and their architecture are unique. The land given to the Shankharis was very small in size. The houses were built according to that size. The main gate in front of the house was about six feet. Then a long corridor of about twenty to thirty feet went inside. Then the buildings extended about twenty yards to the rear. Most of the houses were four-storeyed. The walls between the two houses were adjacent, without doors or windows and there was no space in between. The space above the first floor was kept open like a small courtyard.
	Tanti Bazar	23°42′46″N 90°24′27″E	Tanti Bazar was once known for its looms, silk, muslin, and cotton fabrics, and was an important center of Dhaka's economy during the Mughal period.
	Panitola (Pannitola)	23°42′38″N 90°24′31″E	
Sutrapur area
	Paridas Road	23°42′21″N 90°24′47″E	
	Hemanta Das Road	23°42′21″N 90°25′00″E	
Ramna area
	Bailey Road	23°44′27″N 90°24′09″E	
	Minto Road	23°44′35″N 90°24′04″E	
	Hare Road	23°44′24″N 90°24′05″E	A row of century-old trees on one side, the silent shade of Ramna Park on the other.
	Park Avenue (Maulana Bhashani Road)	23°44′08″N 90°24′01″E	

== Department of Archaeology's list ==
The Department of Archaeology of Bangladesh also maintains an national official list of protected monuments and sites. These sites are recognized under the Antiquities Act and are preserved for their historical, cultural, and architectural value. The following list includes only those monuments and structures located within the administrative boundaries of Dhaka. These are:

Protected monuments of Dhaka by Department of Archaeology
⠀⠀⠀⠀Image⠀⠀⠀⠀	Site	Location	Built	Built by	Description
Previously mentioned in of RAJUK's list	Sat Gambuj Mosque, Unknown Old Tomb, Khan Mohammad Mridha Mosque, Lalbagh Fort (Southeast Torana, Shahi Mosque, Hammam & Diwan-i-Aam, Tomb of Bibi Pari), Northbrook Hall, Ruplal House, Wise House, Armenian Church, Dhaka, Bara Katra, Chhota Katra, Shahbaz Khan Mosque, Musa Khan Mosque, Nimtali arch, Radha Krishna Temple, Sutrapur, Kolombo Shahib Tomb, Joseph Paget Tomb, Rose Garden Palace, Dhanmondi Shahi Eidgah, Beraid Bhuyanpara Jame Mosque, Dhakeshwari Temple				
Previously mentioned heritage site(s) that were removed from RAJUK list in 2017	Shankhanidhi House				
	Azimpur Shahi Mosque	Azimpur 23°43′38″N 90°22′54″E	1786	Fayzul Alam	Nawabi era mosque
	Tomb of Bibi Champa	Chowk Bazaar 23°42′47″N 90°23′46″E	1671	Shaista Khan	Mughal tomb
	Main gate of Nawabbari adjacent to Ahsan Manzil	16/1 Nawab Ahsan Ullah Road, Islampur 23°42′38″N 90°24′22″E	1859	Khwaja Ahsanullah	British era gatehouse
	Sutrapur Jamindar Bari (Revati Mohan Das House)	Sutrapur 23°42′21″N 90°25′05″E	1900s	Zamindar Roy Bahadur Satyendra Kumar Das	British era palace
	Bhajahari Lodge (Demolished)	Sutrapur 23°42′56″N 90°24′58″E	1925	Bhajahari Saha	Demolished palace

== Hidden Heritage's list ==
Hidden Heritage: Homes in Dhaka is a research project carried out under the broader initiative Silent Heritage: Buildings in Bangladesh. The project aims to document historic residences and other architecturally significant structures across the country. In its first phase, five houses in Dhaka were selected for detailed documentation. These are:

⠀⠀⠀⠀Image⠀⠀⠀⠀	Structure	Location	Built	Built by	Description
Previously mentioned in Department of Archeology's list	Sutrapur Jamindar Bari (Revati Mohan Das House)				
	Haturia House (Baghbari) (Tiger House) & Khanka E Aliya	Bangsal 23°43′05″N 90°24′01″E	1920	Zamindar of Haturia	British era house & khankah
	Kabir House	Eskaton 23°44′41″N 90°23′52″E	1952	Syed Gholam Kabir	Pakistan era house Later ofiice
	Rajshahi House	Maghbazar 23°44′47″N 90°24′22″E	1957	Murtaza Raza Choudhry Architect: Arjun Roy	Pakistan era house
	Asaf Khan House	Dhanmondi 23°44′28″N 90°23′00″E	1960		Pakistan era house

== Other unprotected heritage sites ==
The following structures are not included in any official heritage list. Their recognition as heritage remains a matter of interpretation, and their status is sometimes debated in terms of historical or cultural value.

⠀⠀⠀⠀Image⠀⠀⠀⠀	Site	Location	Built	Built by	Description
	Beauty Boarding	Bangla Bazar 23°42′23″N 90°24′47″E	Between 1900 to 1947	Sudhir Chandra Das	British era palace
	Ramna Kali Mandir	Ramna 23°26′06″N 90°14′09″E	1600s Rebuilt: 2021	Initial: Gopalgiri Built by: Harichara Giri Development: Bilasmani Devi Rebuilt by: Government of Bangladesh	Mughal era temple
	Baitul Mukarram	Motijheel 23°43′46″N 90°24′46″E	Start: 1959 End: 1968	Government of East Pakistan Architect: Abdulhusein M. Thariani	National mosque of Bangladesh
	Mausoleum of Three Leaders	Ramna 23°43′45″N 90°24′00″E	1963	Government of East Pakistan Architect: Masud Ahmad & S.A. Zahiruddin	Pakistan era Monument
	Old Sangsad Bhaban	Tejgaon 23°46′06″N 90°23′28″E	c. 1960s	Government of East Pakistan	Old parliament house Now Prime Minister's Office
	Bangabhaban	Dilkusha 23°43′24″N 90°25′04″E	1905	Eastern Bengal and Assam British Government	Official Residence of President of Bangladesh
	July Revolution Memorial Museum (Former Ganabhaban) (Former State Guest House Karatoa)	Sher-e-Bangla Nagar 23°45′55″N 90°22′26″E	1974	Government of Bangladesh	Museum; Former residence of Prime Minister of Bangladesh; Former state guest house
	Supreme Court of Bangladesh building	Shahbag 23°43′51″N 90°24′09″E	1968	Government of East Pakistan	Head office of Supreme Court of Bangladesh
	Residence of the Chief Justice (House No. 19. Hare Road)	Hare Rd. 23°44′17″N 90°24′16″E	1905	Eastern Bengal and Assam British Government	Official residence of Chief Justice of Bangladesh
	State Guest House Sugandha	Bailey Rd. 23°44′25″N 90°24′08″E	1905	Eastern Bengal and Assam British Government	Office of Foreign Service Academy; Former State Guest House; Former Prime Minister's Office. Former office of President of Bangladesh
	Bangladesh National Museum building	Shahbag 23°44′25″N 90°24′08″E	1983	Government of Bangladesh Architect: Syed Mainul Hossain	Building of national museum of Bangladesh
	Sadarghat	Sadarghat 23°42′20″N 90°24′36″E	1600s	Mughals	Mughal inland port
	Sree Sree Baraderswari Kalimata Temple (Rajarbagh Kali Temple)	Rajarbagh 23°44′19″N 90°26′39″E	1790s	Man Singh I	Mughal Temple
	Loknath Brahmachari Ashram and Temple	Swamibag 23°42′45″N 90°25′24″E	1905	Mathuramohan Mukherjee	British era Temple
	Shyambazar Shiva Temple	Farashganj 23°42′15″N 90°24′46″E	Unknown	Unknown	Built before 1800
	Puthi Ghar	74/1, B. K. Dash Rd	c. 1850	Unknown	
	Sri Sri Priyo Bollov	3, B. K. Dash Rd. 23°42′11″N 90°24′53″E	c. 1900s	Shyam Babu	
	Sri Sri Bonko Biharri Zeu Mandir	2, B. K. Dash Rd. 23°42′10″N 90°24′55″E	c. 1900s	Unknown	
	Mongalalaya (Putul bari) (Doll house)	65, B. K. Dash Rd. 23°42′09″N 90°24′55″E	1915	Ashutosh Das	
	Bibi Ka Rawza	11, B. K. Dash Rd. 23°42′07″N 90°24′56″E	1600	Unknown	1st husayniyya of Dhaka
	Baro Bari	45, B. K. Dash Rd. 23°42′07″N 90°24′59″E	c. 1900s	Zamindar Prasanna Babu	
	Dhola palace (Dholla House)	Wari 23°43′03″N 90°24′58″E	c. 1900s	Zamindar of Dhola, Girish Chandra Pal Chowdhury	
	Mangalabas	Shyambazar 23°42′11″N 90°24′58″E	c. 1890s	Jatindra Kumar Saha	
	Jalsa house of Murapara Zaminder	Revati Mohan Das Rd. 23°42′24″N 90°25′05″E	c. 1920s	Murapara Zaminder Mukul Banerjee	
	Hrishikesh Das House	Hrishikesh Das Rd. 23°42′29″N 90°25′04″E	c. 1920s	Hrishikesh Das	
	Azad Movie Theater	Johnson Rd. 23°42′41″N 90°24′35″E	1929	Murapara zaminder Mukul Banerjee	British era movie theater
	Kaley Khan Jamjam Cannon (Kalu JhamJham Cannon)	Under Buriganga Riverbed	1660	Mir Jumla II	Sunken Mughal Cannon
	Fulbaria railway station	Fulbaria 23°43′28″N 90°24′21″E	1895	Assam Bengal Railway	Defunct train station
	K. L. Jubilee High School & College; Old buildings	Bangla Bazar 23°42′19″N 90°24′45″E	1863	Zamindar Kishorilal Roy Chowdhury	British era private school
	Mia Shaheb Moidan	Luxmibazar 23°42′28″N 90°25′01″E	1709	Al Hajj Shah Sufi Abdur Rahim Shaheed (Mia Shaheb)	Historic Sufi lodge (Khankah) field. Now Waqfah of Shah Shaheb, known as "Shah Shaheb Bari Jam-e Masjid" Now this Waqfah contains: Astana's Mosque (1909); Graveyard; Mutawalli Room; Mazar of Mia Shaheb (1738); Gaddi nasheen's Huzur Khana (1824)
	Mill Barrack	Gendaria 23°42′00″N 90°25′08″E	1840s	Dacca Sugar Works Company British Government	Historic factory Later military ground Now police camp
	Muslim Government High School; Old buildings	Luxmibazar 23°42′31″N 90°24′47″E	1874	Governor George Campbell Funding: Mohsin Fund	Historic madrasa now secondary school
	Old Dhaka Central Jail	Chawkbazar 23°43′07″N 90°23′53″E	1778	British government	Historic prison now museum
	Mazar of Shah Ali Baghdadi	Mirpur 23°47′49″N 90°20′56″E	1480	Followers of Shah Ali Baghdadi	Historic mazar and shrine
	St. Francis Xavier's Girls' High School; Old buildings	Luxmibazar 23°42′31″N 90°24′49″E	1912	Congregation of Our Lady of the Missions, Catholic Church	British era school
	Gurdwara Sangat Tola	Bangla Bazar 23°42′23″N 90°24′51″E	1660	Guru Tegh Bahadur	Mughal era Gurdwara
	Dhaka Collegiate School; Old buildings	Loyal st. 23°42′28″N 90°24′39″E	1835	East India Company	British School

=== Demolished or fully replaced ===
The following structures have been demolished or completely rebuilt, resulting in the loss of their original form:

⠀⠀⠀⠀Image⠀⠀⠀⠀	Site	Location	Built	Built by	Description
	Chawkbazar Shahi Mosque (Chawk Mosque)	Chawkbazar 23°42′58″N 90°23′45″E	1664	Shaista Khan	Mughal Mosque; Original structure has fully been lost
	Gandaria railway station	Gendaria 23°42′05″N 90°25′44″E	1895 Renov. 2024	Assam Bengal Railway	British train station
	Tomb of Dara Begum	Lalmatia 23°45′19″N 90°21′56″E	1600s	Shaista Khan	Now incorporated into prayer room of Lalmatia Shahi Mosque
	Tomb of Lado Bibi (Demolished)	Babu Bazar 23°42′41″N 90°24′06″E	1600s	Shaista Khan	Demolished during construction of Mitford Hospital's ladies’ ward
	Islam Khan Mosque	Islampur 23°42′40″N 90°24′24″E	c. 1632	Islam Khan I	Original structure has fully been lost
	Hayat Bepari's Mosque	Narinda 23°42′36″N 90°25′03″E	1664	Hayat Bepari	Original structure has fully been lost
	Churihatta Mosque	Narinda 23°43′00″N 90°23′39″E	1649	On the orders of Shah Shuja, Muhammadi Begh or, temple built by a hindu officer later modified/rebuilt as a mosque	Original structure has fully been lost
	Allakuri Mosque	Sat Masjid Rd. 23°45′24″N 90°21′42″E	1680		Original structure has fully been lost
	Armanitola Mosque	Armanitola 23°42′52″N 90°24′10″E	1716	Ahmad	Original structure has fully been lost
	Mariam Saleha Mosque (Bibi Mariyam Shahi Masjid)	Nilkhet 23°44′00″N 90°23′10″E	1706	Mariam Saleha	Original structure has fully been lost
	Bibi Meher Mosque	Narinda	1814	Bibi Meher	Original structure has fully been lost
	Navarai Lane Mosque	Islampur			Original structure has fully been lost
	Sitara Begum Mosque	Shingtola 23°42′23″N 90°24′51″E	1819	Sitara Begum	Original structure has fully been lost
	Farrukh Siyar Mosque (Lalbagh Shahi Mosque)	Lalbagh 23°43′04″N 90°23′22″E	1703	Farrukhsiyar	Original structure has fully been lost
	Aga Masih Lane Mosque	Bangsal 23°43′17″N 90°24′15″E	1800s	Aga Masih	Original structure has fully been lost
	Lalmatia Shahi Mosque (Bibi's mosque)	Lalmatia 23°45′20″N 90°21′56″E	1665	Shaista Khan	Original structure has fully been lost
	Dewan Bazar Mosque (Demolished)	Nimtali 23°43′28″N 90°24′12″E	1700s		Demolished
	Dilkusha Bhulbhulaiya Garden Tower (Demolished)	Dilkusha 23°43′38″N 90°25′07″E	1866	Khwaja Abdul Ghani	Demolished garden and maze
	Israt Manzil Palace (Later Hotel Shahbag) (Demolished)	Shahbag 23°44′19″N 90°23′40″E	1800s	Nawab of Dhaka	Demolished hotel
	Muqim Katra (Demolished)	Dilkusha 23°43′27″N 90°25′12″E	1660s	Mir Muhammad Muqim	Demolished caravanserai
	Naswal Street Mosque (Demolished)		c. 1409	Mubarakabad	
	Manda Mosque (Nondu Bepari Mosque) (Demolished)	Manda 23°43′56″N 90°26′33″E	1433		
	Nimtali Palace (Demolished)	Nimtali 23°43′28″N 90°24′09″E	1766	Naib Nazim of Dhaka Jesarat Khan	

== Modern Heritage Sites ==
=== Institute of Architect's list ===
In November 2022, the Institute of Architects Bangladesh (IAB) published the first edition of its List of Modern Heritage Sites in Bangladesh. The list was prepared by the Heritage, Education, Awareness and Research (HEAR) Committee of the 24th Executive Council of IAB, with the aim of raising awareness, promoting conservation, and ensuring proper recognition of 20th-century architectural works associated with the modern movement in Bangladesh.

The selection highlights projects of architectural, cultural, and historical significance, designed by both national and internationally renowned architects. According to IAB, the list is not exhaustive but serves as an initial step toward the documentation and safeguarding of modern heritage in the country.

Although the publication covers sites nationwide, the following section includes only those modern heritage sites located within Dhaka city.

Institute of Architect's list of Modern Heritage Sites of Dhaka
⠀⠀⠀⠀Image⠀⠀⠀⠀	Site	Architect	Location	Year	Description
	National Assembly Complex of Jatiya Sangsad Bhaban	Louis Kahn	Sher-e-Bangla Nagar 23°45′45″N 90°22′43″E	1962–84	National Assembly building of Bangladesh
	National Assembly Sector of Jatiya Sangsad Bhaban	Louis Kahn	Sher-e-Bangla Nagar 23°45′45″N 90°22′43″E	1962–84	Area encompassing Jatiya Sangsad Bhaban
	Housing Type – E, F, G & H of Jatiya Sangsad Bhaban	Louis Kahn	Sher-e-Bangla Nagar	1962–84	MP housing adjacent of Jatiya Sangsad Bhaban
	Shaheed Suhrawardy Medical College	Louis Kahn	Sher-e-Bangla Nagar 23°46′09″N 90°22′17″E	1962–84	Hospital
	Faculty of Fine Arts (Formerly, Institute of Fine Arts)	Muzharul Islam	Dhaka University 23°44′09″N 90°23′42″E	1953–55	Classrooms, exhibition spaces and faculty area of DU
	Dhaka University Central Library (Old Building)	Muzharul Islam	Dhaka University 23°44′00″N 90°23′43″E	1953–55	Library
	Building 75 and Ladies Club of Azimpur Government Colony (Azimpur Ladies Club)	Muzharul Islam	Azimpur Colony 23°43′43″N 90°23′03″E	1962	Housing for Govt. Employees
	Bangladesh Council of Scientific and Industrial Research (BCSIR) (Science Lab)	Muzharul Islam	New Elephant rd. 23°44′22″N 90°23′06″E	1964	Scientific Research and Publication
	Faculty of Business Studies (Formerly, The National Institute of Public Administration or NIPA)	Muzharul Islam	Dhaka University 23°44′07″N 90°23′33″E	1964	Educational & Academic Institute
	Bangladesh Road Research Laboratory	Muzharul Islam	Kallyanpur 23°47′13″N 90°21′23″E	1964	Research and Testing Facility
	Jahangirnagar University	Muzharul Islam	Savar 23°52′46″N 90°16′08″E	1967	University Campus
	Bangladesh Agricultural Development Corporation	Muzharul Islam	Motijheel 23°43′36″N 90°25′03″E	1969	Office Building
	Library Building, Directorate of Archives and Libraries	Muzharul Islam	Agargaon 23°46′33″N 90°22′27″E	1976	Library
	Ramna Restaurant (Euro Asiano Restaurant)	Muzharul Islam	Ramna Park 23°44′07″N 90°24′07″E	1963	Restaurant
	Jiban Bima Tower	Muzharul Islam	Motijheel 23°43′38″N 90°24′56″E	1970	Office Building
	Teacher-Student Centre (TSC)	Constantinos A. Doxiadis	Dhaka University 23°43′52″N 90°23′46″E	1957	Students union, club center.
	Government College of Applied Human Science (Formerly, College of Home Economics, Dhaka)	Constantinos A. Doxiadis	Azimpur 23°43′53″N 90°23′08″E	1965	College
	National Academy for Educational Management (NAEM)	Constantinos A. Doxiadis	Behind Dhaka College 23°44′11″N 90°22′49″E	1960	Academic building
	Institute of Education and Research (IER)	Constantinos A. Doxiadis	Dhaka University 23°44′06″N 90°23′37″E	1960	Institution for the study of education
	Academic Building, Department of Architecture, BUET	Richard Vrooman	BUET 23°43′40″N 90°23′29″E	1965–69	Academic building
	Academic Building, Department of Civil Engineering, BUET	Robert G. Boughey	BUET 23°43′36″N 90°23′33″E	1965	Academic building
	BUET – Gymnasium	Robert G. Boughey	BUET 23°43′33″N 90°23′26″E	1964	Gym
	Titumir Hall, BUET	Robert G. Boughey	BUET 23°43′32″N 90°23′29″E	1962–64	Residential hall
	Shaheed Suhrawardi Hall, BUET	Robert G. Boughey	BUET 23°43′35″N 90°23′25″E		Residential hall
	Sher-e-Bangla Hall, BUET	Robert G. Boughey	BUET 23°43′34″N 90°23′27″E		Residential hall
	St. Joseph Higher Secondary School	Robert G. Boughey	Asad Gate 23°45′38″N 90°22′14″E	1963–64	School
	Priests and Seminarians Residence, Notre Dame College (Matthew House)	Robert G. Boughey	Motijheel 23°43′46″N 90°25′15″E	1963–64	Residential Building
	Holy Family Hospital's Sisters' Hostel	Robert G. Boughey	Maghbazar 23°44′49″N 90°24′11″E	1963–65	Hostel
	Kamalapur railway station	Daniel C. Dunham, Robert G. Boughey	Kamalapur 23°43′55″N 90°25′34″E	1961–68	Public Building
	BUET Staff Housing (Currently known as Building no. 1.2,3, Bakshi bazaar – BUET Staff quarter)	Daniel C. Dunham, Berger Engineers	BUET 23°43′33″N 90°23′11″E	1962	Housing for the faculty members of BUET.
	Holy Family Red Crescent Medical College Hospital	Ronald Mc Connel	Maghbazar 23°44′48″N 90°24′11″E	1953– 71	Hospital
	Nine-storied Secretariat Building	Ronald Mc Connel	Segunbagicha 23°43′44″N 90°24′31″E	1952–71	Secretariat Building
	Block –B, BSMMU (Formerly, Hotel Shahbag) (Earlier, Israt Manzil Palace)	Edward Hicks	Shahbag 23°44′19″N 90°23′40″E	1948–59	Six-story building for administrative offices and nursing quarters
	Hotel Purbani	Berger Engineers	Dilkusha 23°43′40″N 90°25′01″E	1963–64	Hotel
	InterContinental Dhaka	William B. Tabler	Ramna 23°44′28″N 90°23′47″E	1964–66	Hotel
	Bangladesh Chemical Industries Corporation (BCIC) Tower	Bashirul Haq	Dilkusha 23°43′40″N 90°35′10″E	1977–87	Office Building
	Bangladesh Agricultural Research Council (BARC)	Bashirul Haq	Farmgate 23°43′40″N 90°23′21″E	1978–81	Institution
	National Martyrs' Memorial	Syed Mainul Hossain	Savar 23°54′40″N 90°15′17″E	1972–82	National Martyrs' Memorial

== See also ==
- Dhaka
- History of Dhaka
- List of archaeological sites in Bangladesh
