= Hrishikesh Das Road =

Street in Bangladesh

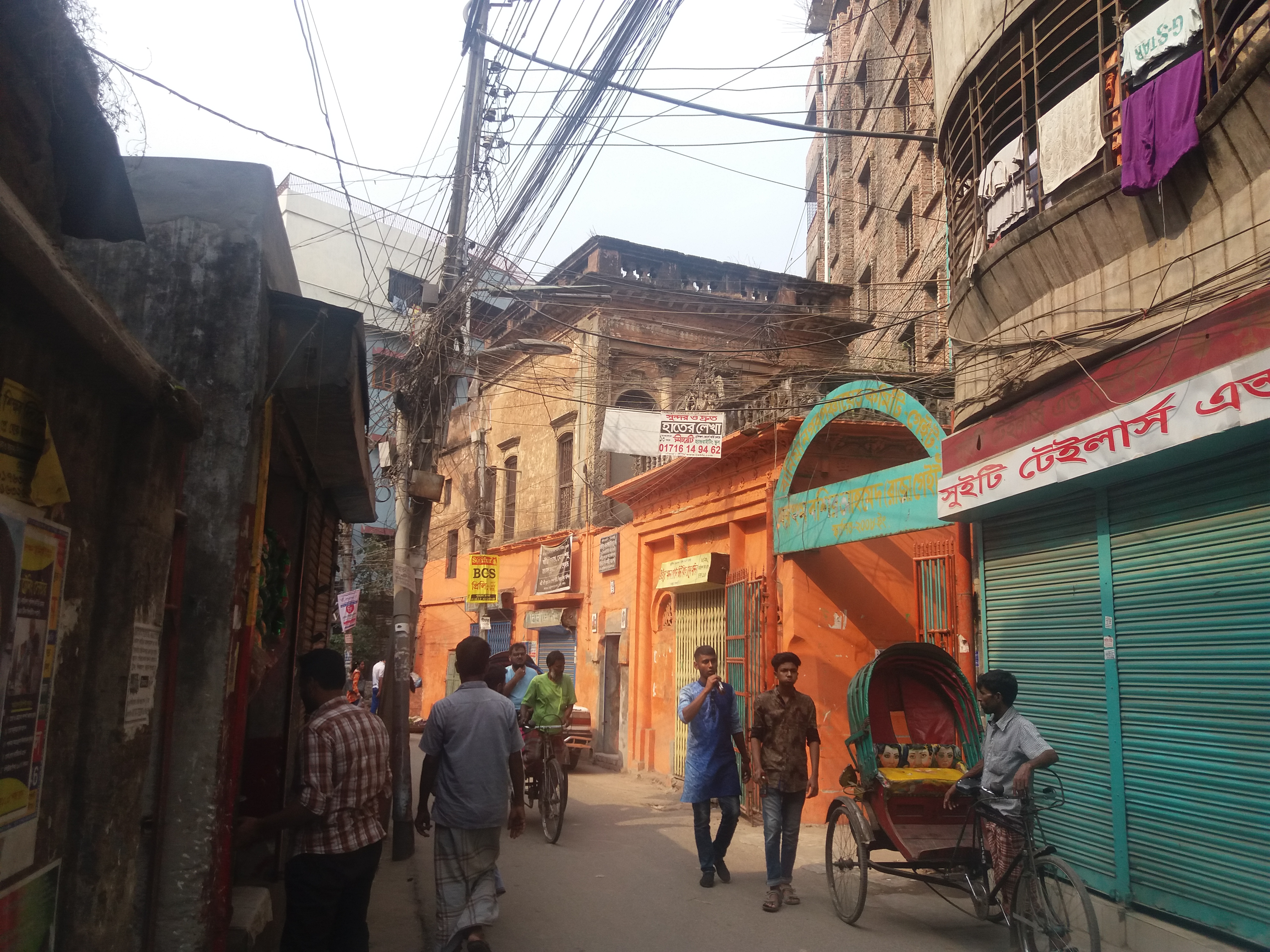
Hrishikesh Das Road

Hrishikesh Das Road (Bengali: হৃষিকেশ দাস রোড) is a traditional street situated in Sutrapur, Dhaka. Its alternative name is Hrishikesh Das Lane. Its length is 1 km. Include the road, there are many routes as main entryway to Sutrapur. There are several old and traditional structures along the road.

== History ==
Hrishikesh Das was a wealthy banker and businessman of the nineteenth century. He produced bricks, surki and traded lime, wood and coal. He was also a zamindar. He paid for the cost of electric lighting from Municipal Street to Narinda pool. That is why this part of Walter Road is named as Hrishikesh Das Road. It was formed from a part of the former Walter Road.

Hrishikesh Das Road is the place of heritage buildings. In 2009, RAJUK published a gazette, through the gazette it declared the road as heritage site for its historical importance.

In 2018, the government wanted to demolish a historic house on the road, but it was stopped by an order from High court.

== Architecture ==
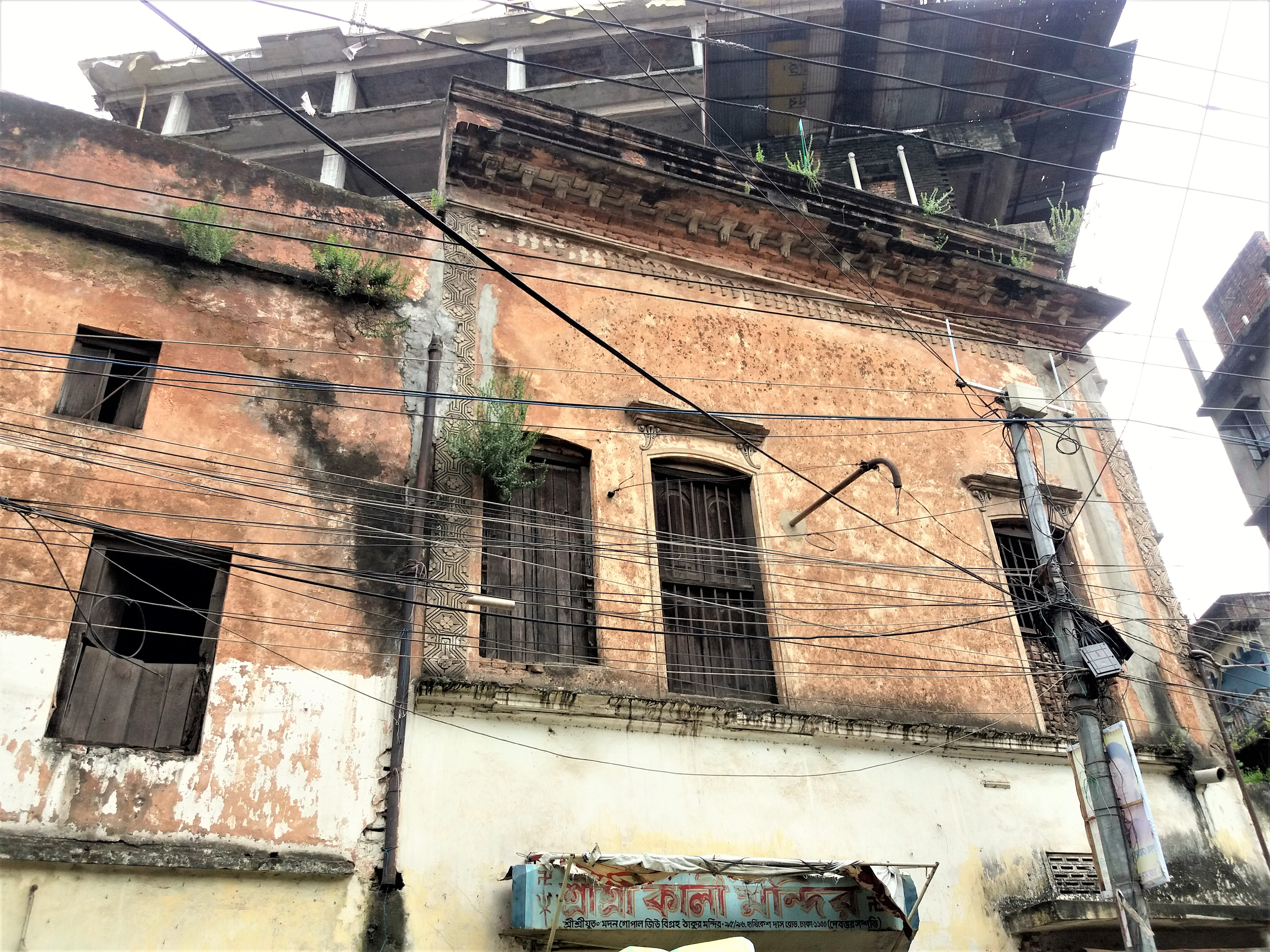
Sriyut Madan Gopal Jiu Vigraha Thakur Temple

On both sides of Hrishikesh Das Road, there are numerous structures of British period which are more than one hundred years old. These houses have semicircular arches, stained glass windows, herpet-designed parapets, and beautiful porches with metal or wooden pillars. The complete beauty of these buildings cannot be realized from the outside. Many homes have open courtyards that can only be seen through a narrow entrance.

According to the elders, there is a house owned by the family of zamindar from Murapara. Many zamindars, whose zamindari was outside Dhaka, also built houses here. From this, the historical significance of this area can be understood.

There are two old temples named Sriyut Madan Gopal Jiu Vigraha Thakur Temple and Sri Sri Sitanath Jiu Vigraha Temple. However, due to lack of conservation, they are losing their architectural beauty.

The Hayat Bepari Mosque, established in 1664, is located on this street. The mosque was established by Hayat Bepari, the builder of the Narinda bridge. It had one dome and resembled the Binat Bibi Mosque of Narinda, but the original form has been lost during re-modellings.
