= B. K. Dash Road =

Road in Dhaka, Bangladesh

B.K. Dash Road is in the southern side of Dhaka, Bangladesh. Adjacent to the Buriganga River, it lies on the 79th ward of Farashganj. The street was named after renowned businessman Bashanto Kumar Dash in 1927.

== History ==
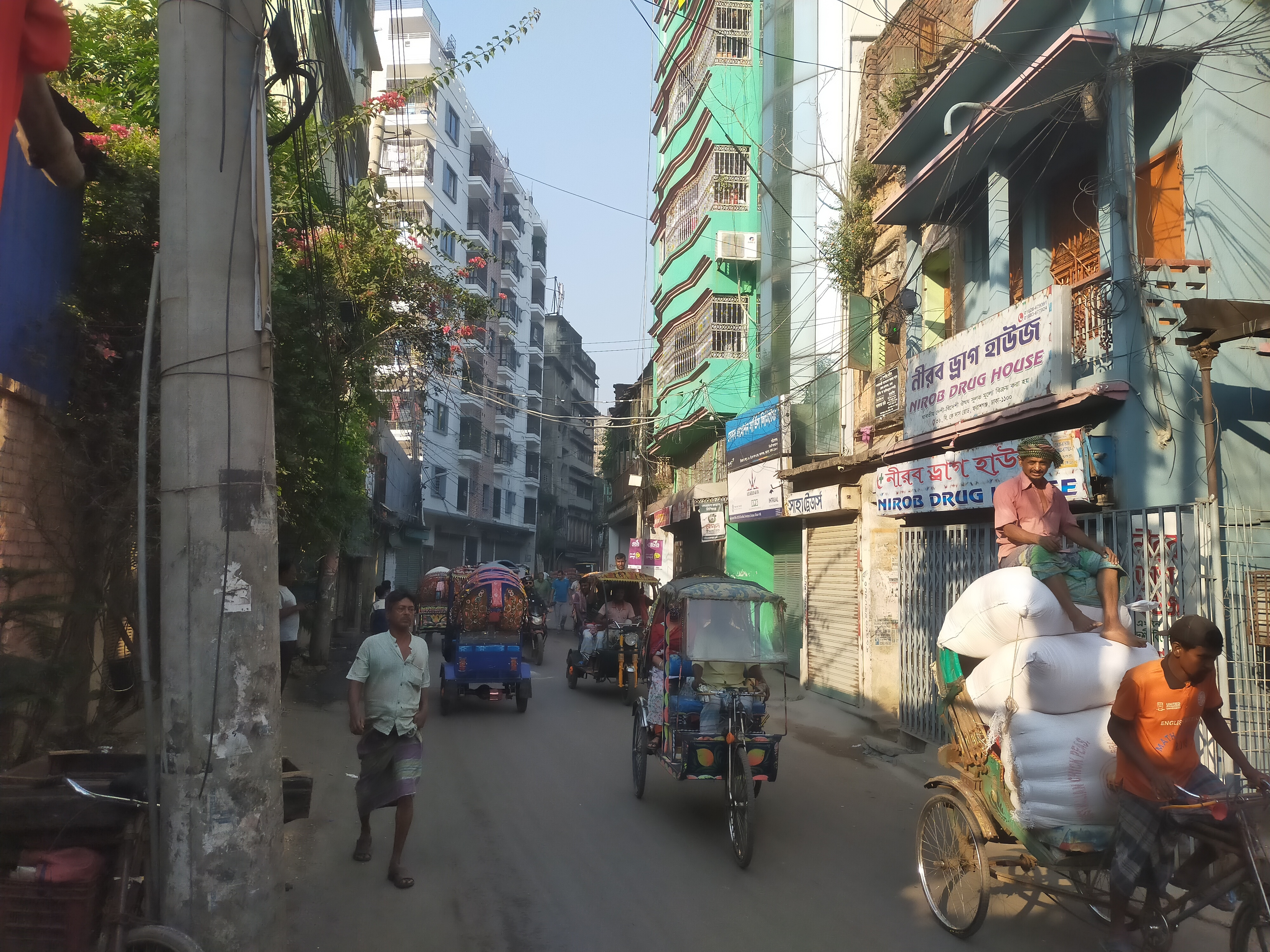
A recent photo of B.K. Dash Road, Farashganj, Dhaka (2025)

=== Bashanto Kumar Das ===
Bashanto Kumar was a man form Barisal, Bangladesh. He migrated to Dhaka when he was only 12. He later settled in Farashganj and also engaged in business from the area.

=== Early years ===
Bashanto Kumar Das used to be a highly influential business man of Dhaka city in the early 1920s. The local community of Farashganj name the lane in the honor of Bashanto Kumar Das. The lane used to be residential zone. Dhaka cities elite people residence use to lie on the B.K. Dash Lane. Many historical structures lie on the lane.

== Historical structures ==
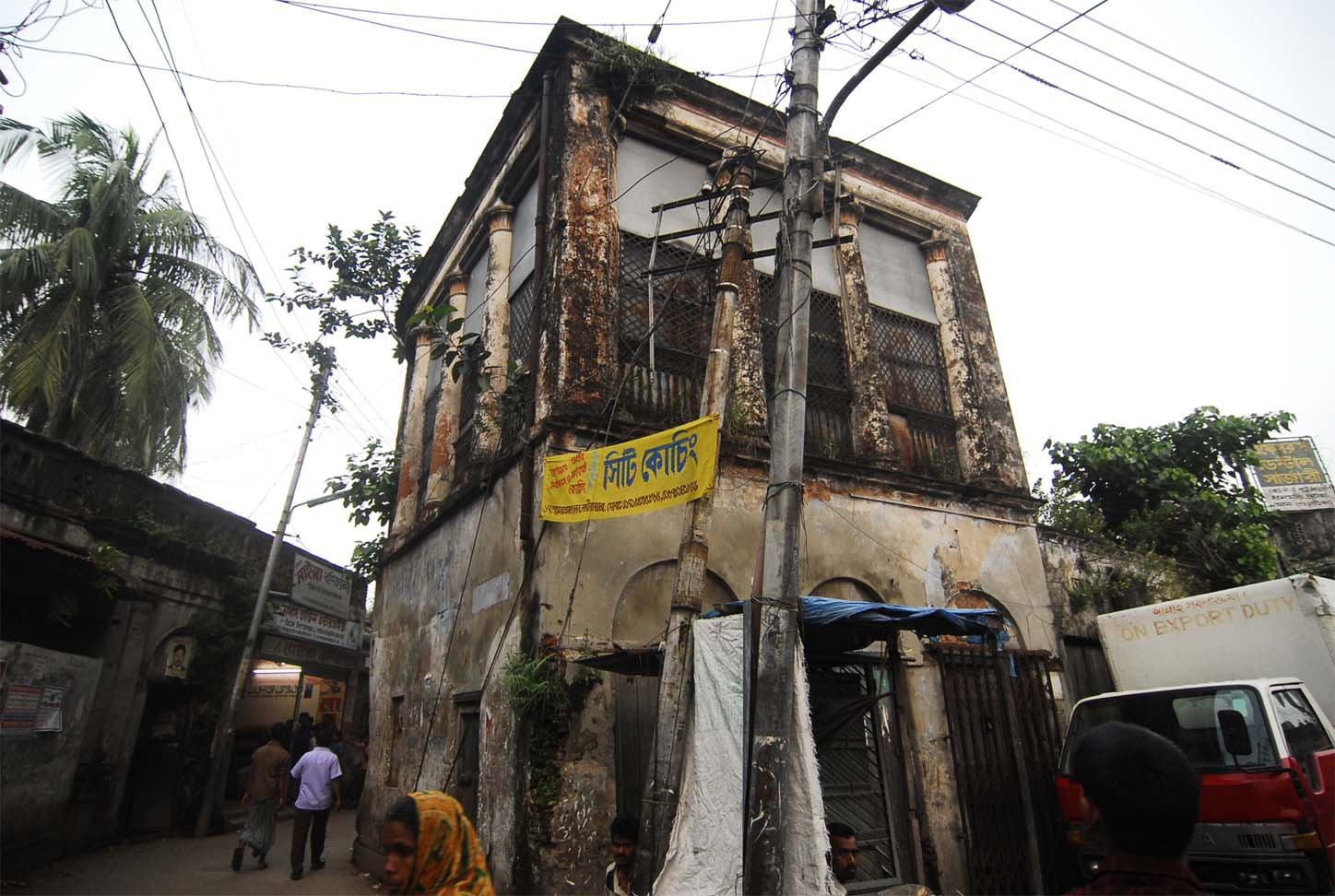
Puthi Ghar

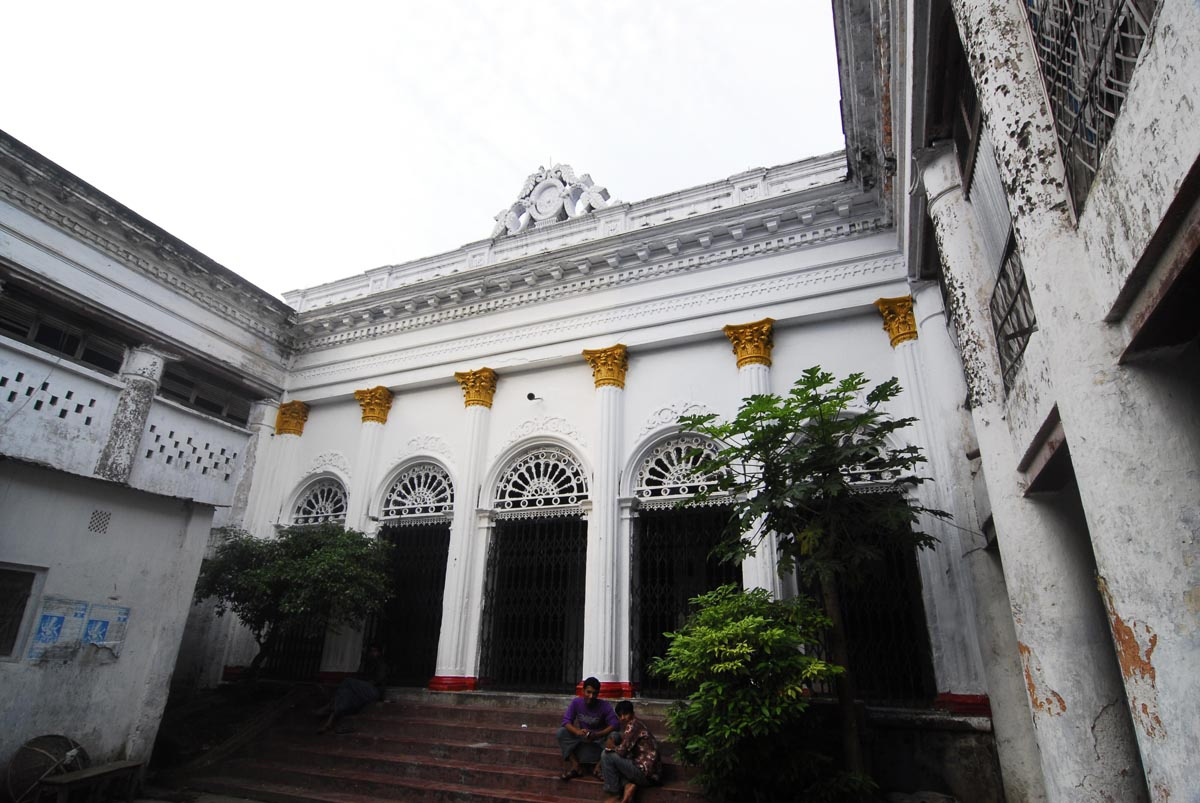
Sri Sri Priyo Bollov

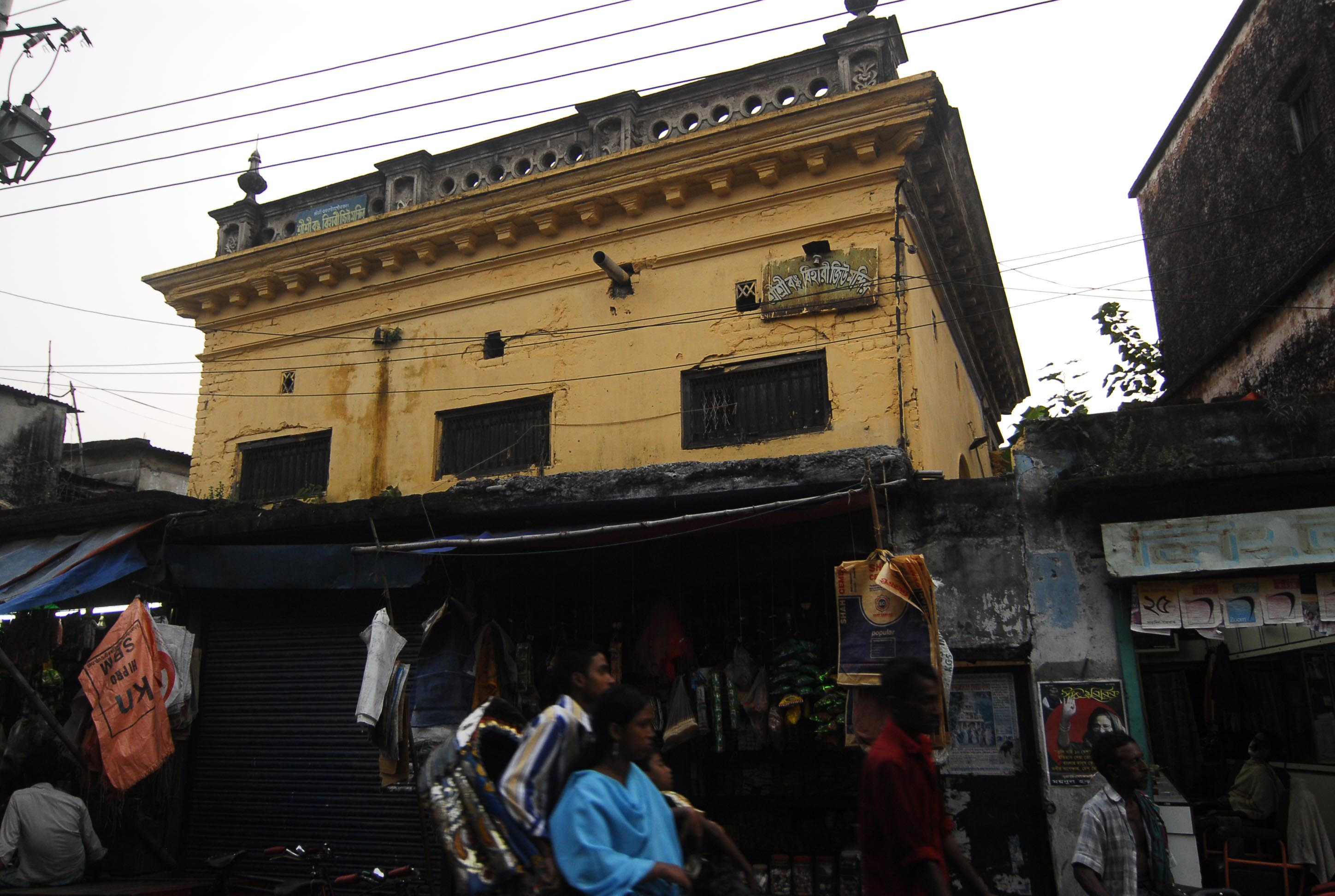
Sri Sri Bonko

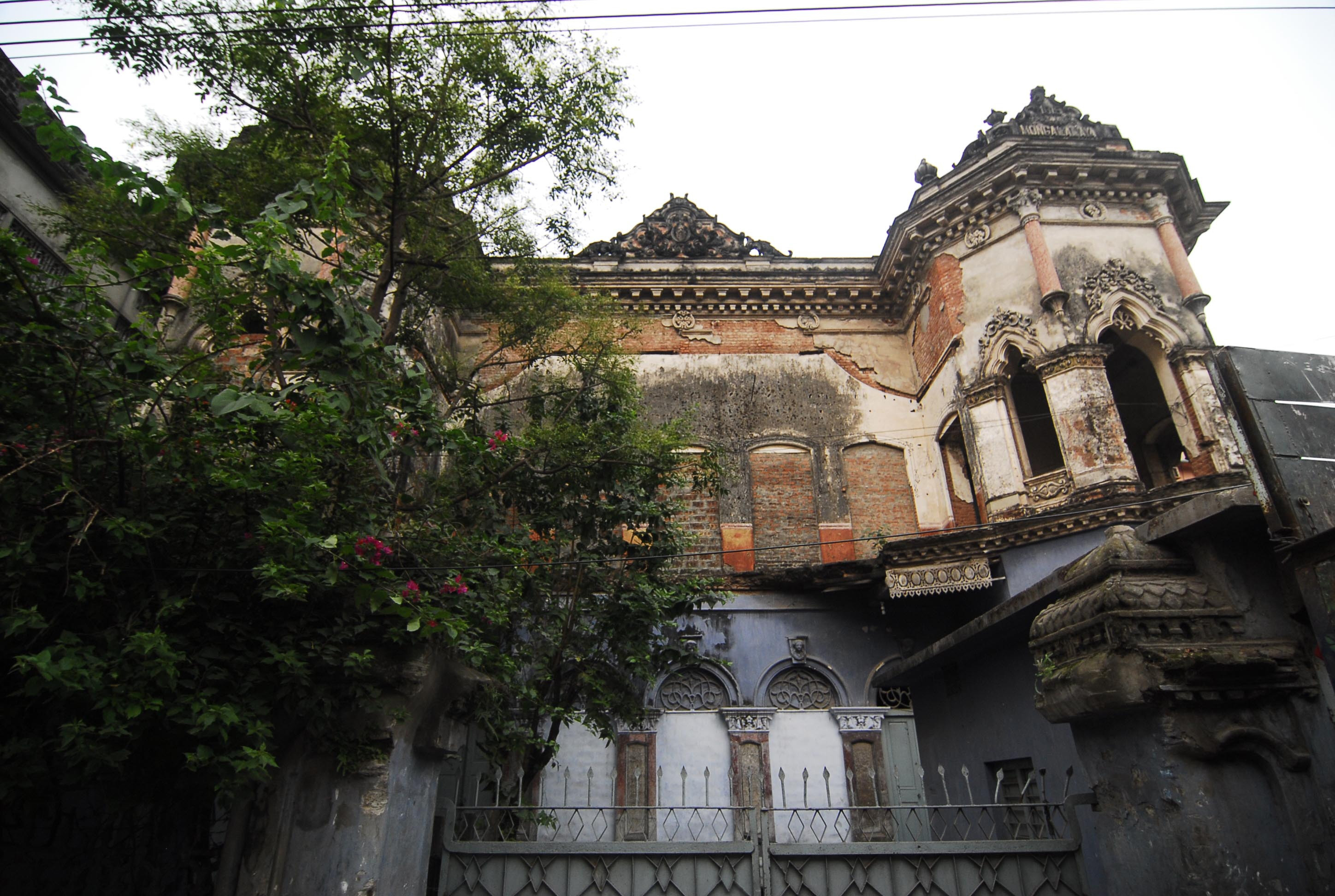
Mongalalaya

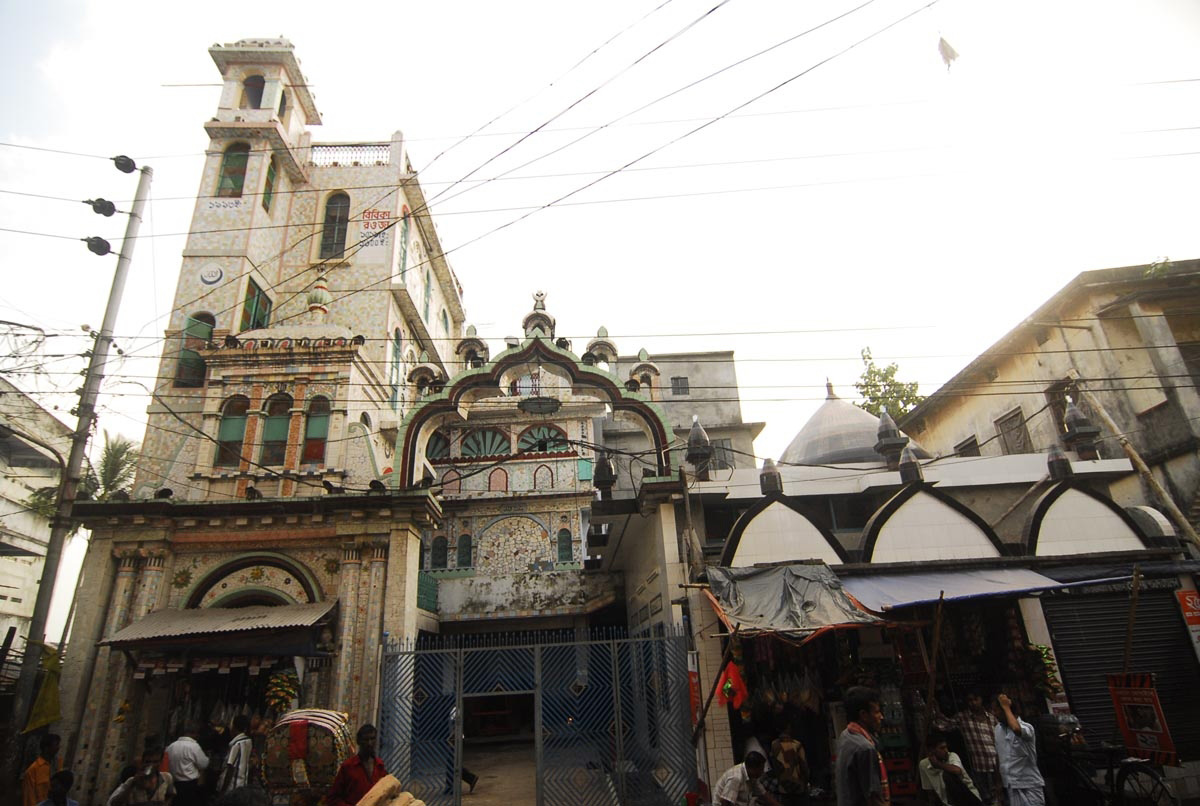
Bibi Ka Rawza

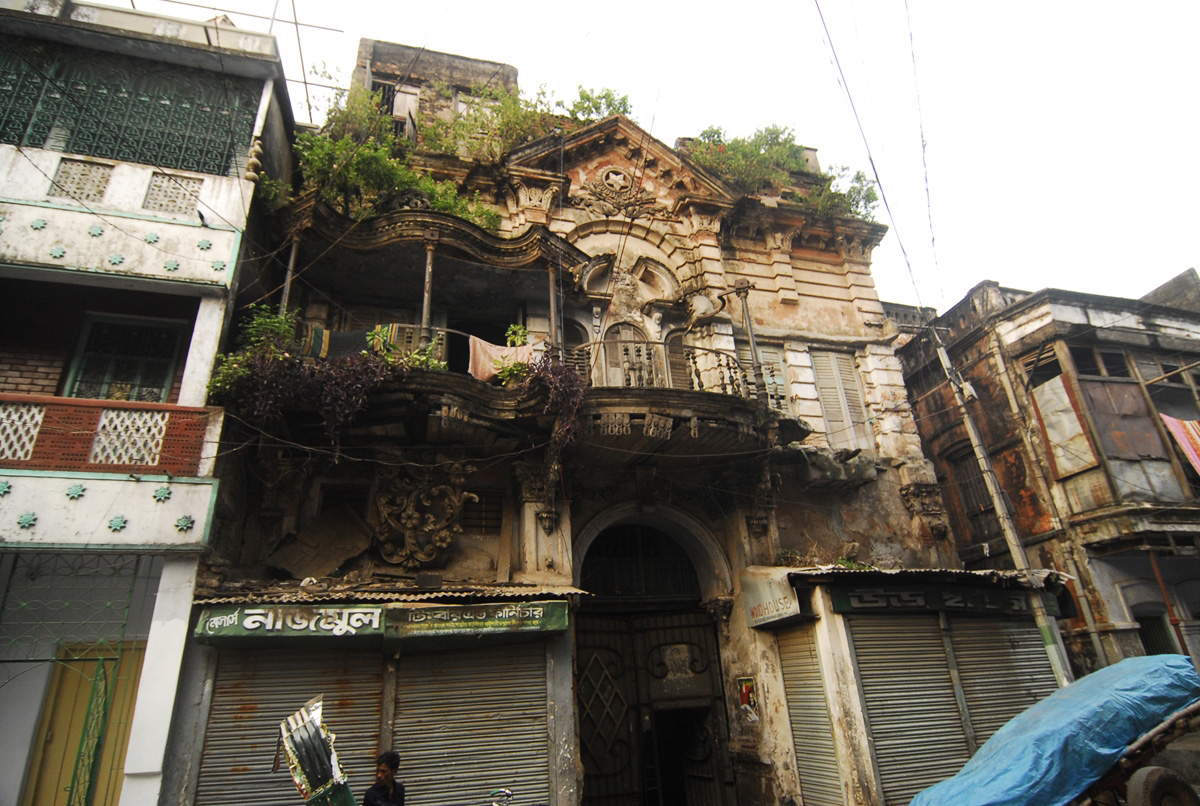
Baro Bari

=== Puthi Ghar ===
Situated in 74/1 B.K.Das Lane. Built approximately 150 years ago. Original owner is unknown. At present it is divided up for different purposes by more than one owner. Minister Gautam Chakkrobory owns the major part of the structure. Its structural condition is stable.

=== Sri Sri Priyo Bollov ===
Situated in 3 B.K.Dash Lane. Built a hundred years ago. Originally owned by Shams Babu. Now it is regulated by a committee.

=== Sri Sri Bonko Biharri Zeu Mandir ===
Situated in 2 B.K.Dash Road. Built more than a 100 years ago by Bashonto Kumar Dash. Now it is regulated by Nadu Babu. It is in a quite unstable condition.

=== Mongalalaya ===
Situated in 65, B.K.Das Lane in Farashganj, at present time, Mongalalaya is an architectural gem, that gives us a hint of the past existence of the French residents in Dhaka. It was built by zamindar Ashutosh Das in 1915 and was commonly known as "Putul Bari"; it is an estate that has intricate sculptures on its walls that reflect the elements of Rococo Art. Dilip Kumar Das is the owner by inheritance. He is the grandson of Ashutosh Das. Some part of the structure has become unstable, due to low maintenance.

The front elevation of the Mansion has two balconies overlooking the street. There was an elongated balcony between the two existing ones however, during the 1971 war with Pakistan, the balcony gets demolished due to the fire ignited by the Pakistani troops. In an interview with a prestigious newspaper, a local named 'Taimur' said, "In Dhaka, during 1971, this was an extremely rare building where the Hindu property owner did not let go of the ownership. The mansion fell victim to arson attack. The balcony collapsed then, and we can still see the charred walls."

The estate has a courtyard surrounding which are the rooms of the mansion. The roof of the Putul Bari overlooks the once glorious Buriganga River; it was previously believed that residing along the peripheral of the Buriganga River was a mark of aristocracy.

The mansion stands as a proof of the wealth of the zamindar that resided in the neighbourhood of Farashganj and how they preferred ornamenting their mansions by sculpting the walls with intricate designs.

=== Bibi Ka Rawza ===
Situated in 11 B.K. Dash Road. Established in 1600 AD. It has been renovated. Today the khadem (caretaker) named Md. Sajjad Hossain takes care of it. The structure was built as Rawza Shariff or Gayabee Mazar. There is a four-storied "Mehman Khana" attached to it.

=== Baro Bari ===
Situated in 45 B.K. Dash Lane. It was built more than 100 years ago. Zamindar Prasanno Babu was the original owner of this residence.

== Present-day condition and usage ==
At present day the lane has been more commercially used. Due to the traffic junctions around, all the elite people who used to live here have migrated to different zones. There is a large number of timber stores.
