= Narinda =

Neighbourhood in Old Dhaka, Bangladesh

Coordinates: 23°24′N 91°04′E

Narinda is a neighbourhood in Old Dhaka and is a pre-Mughal urban settlement. It houses the famous Binat Bibi Mosque. It is just beside Jatrabari

== Notable sites ==
- Christian cemetery, Dhaka
- Binat Bibi Mosque
