= Shahbaz Khan Mosque =

Sunni mosque in Dhaka, Bangladesh

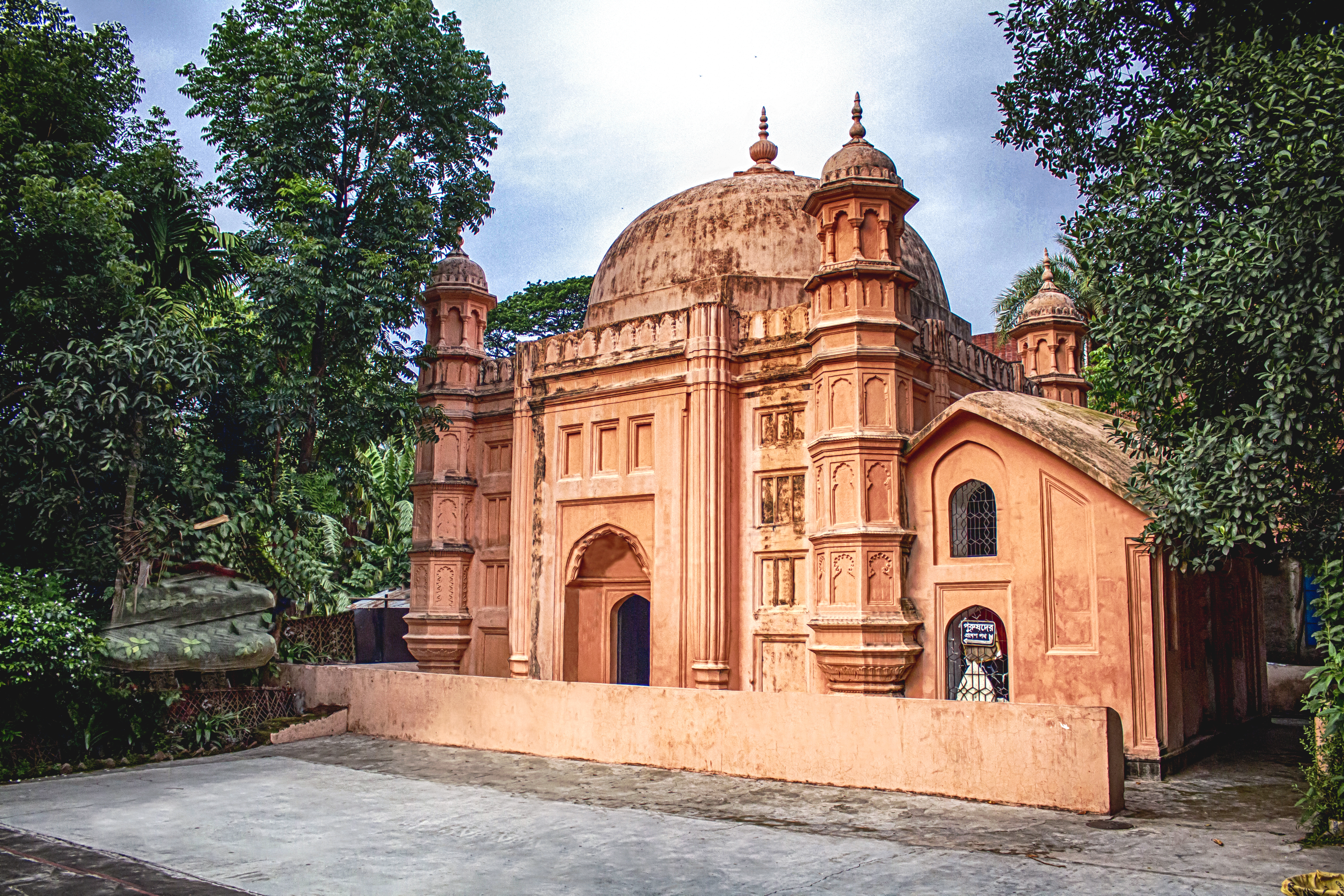

- Location of the mosque in Dhaka

Religion
- Affiliation: Sunni Islam
- Sect: Hanafi
- Ecclesiastical or organizational status: Mosque
- Status: Active

Location
- Location: Shahbag, Dhaka, Dhaka District
- Country: Bangladesh
- Interactive map of Shahbaz Khan Mosque
- Coordinates: 23°43′46″N 90°24′01″E

Architecture
- Type: Mosque architecture
- Style: Mughal
- Completed: 1679 CE

Specifications
- Dome: Three (maybe more)
- Minaret: Four
- Shrine: One (Shahbaz Khan)

The Shahbaz Khan Mosque is a historic Sunni Hanafi mosque, located in Dhaka, in the Dhaka District of Bangladesh. Situated near Mir Jumla’s Gate, the mosque serves as an example of late Mughal architecture in Bengal, known as the Shaista Khan architectural style.

== History ==
The mosque and the adjacent shrine were built in 1679, by Hazi Khwaja Shahbaz Khan, an affluent merchant from Dhaka, who was buried in the shrine after his death.

== Architecture ==
The mosque is rectangular and divided into three equal interior sections, each of which is roofed over by an onion dome. The eastern façade of the mosque has three arched openings, and the northern and southern façades have single-arched openings leading to the prayer hall. The prayer hall houses three semi-octagonal mihrabs, each aligned with one opening through the eastern façade. The central mihrab is larger and highly ornamented with Cyprus-filled kanjuras (decorative merlons), ornate arabesque plastic relief on the spandrels, a cusped arch, and engaged colonettes standing on bulbous floral bases. At the four corners, there are four ribbed, octagonal turrets, capped with plastered cupolas.

In 1950, the Eastern circle of the Pakistan Directorate of Archaeology (DOA) took over the mosque for restoration.

== Gallery ==
Shahbaz Khan Dargah and Mosque complex - 360 degree view, May 2015
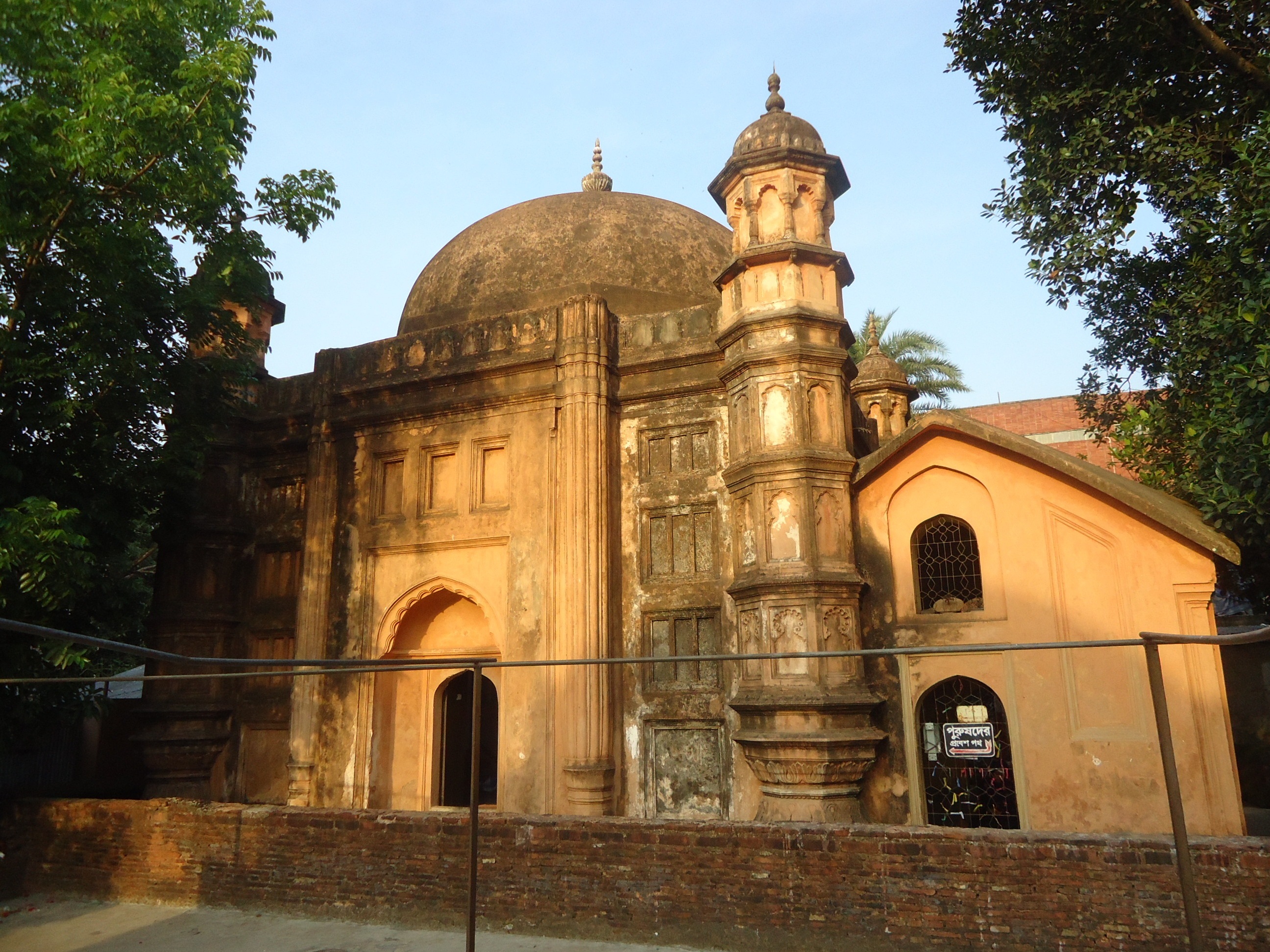
Dargah of Shahbaz Khan

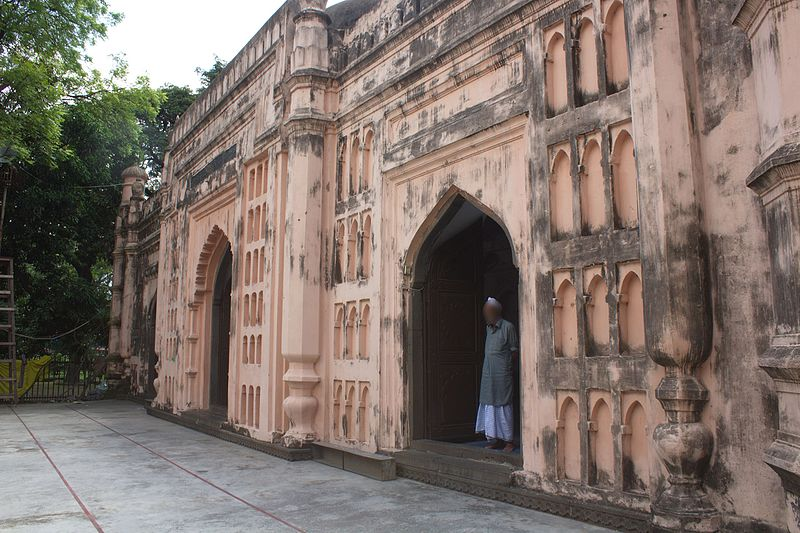
The mosque in 2016

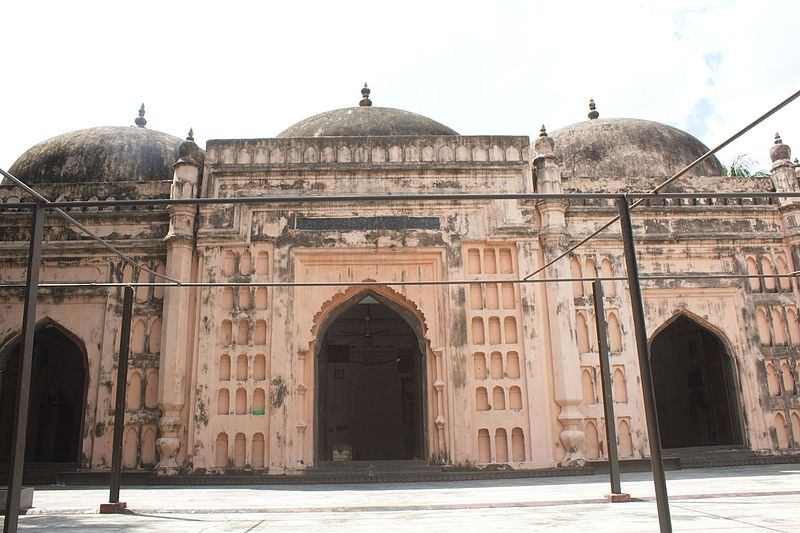
The mosque in 2016

== See also ==
- Islam in Bangladesh
- List of mosques in Bangladesh
- List of archaeological sites in Bangladesh
