= Dhaka University Library =

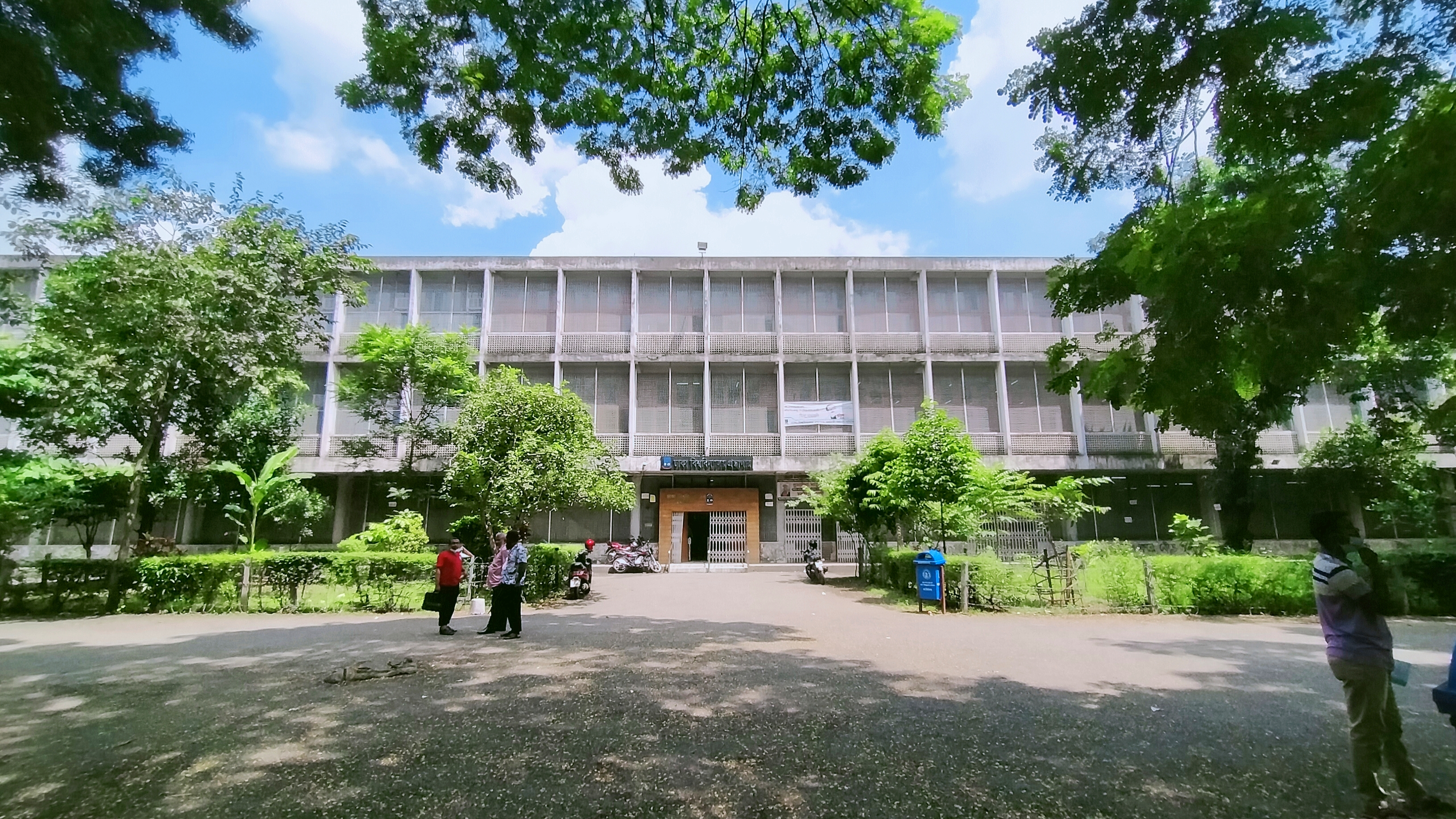
- Dhaka University Library
- 23.733689°N 90.395057°E
- Location: Dhaka University, Dhaka, Bangladesh
- Type: Academic library
- Established: 1921

Collection
- Items collected: Books, journals & rare manuscripts
- Size: 680,000 & 30,000

Other information
- Website: https://www.du.ac.bd/offices/LIB

The Dhaka University Library is the central library of the University of Dhaka, Bangladesh, which started in 1921 with a collection of 18,000 books received from Dhaka College and Law College. The Library now has over 680,000 books and journals. Moreover, it has around 30,000 rare manuscripts. Dhaka University Library is the largest in the country.

The university building is situated beside the TSC main centre on the way towards the Charukala art faculty building of Dhaka University. All the activities of the library are performed from three separate buildings viz. administrative building, main library building and extension building and science library building. The present total measurement of the buildings is 150,830 square feet. But earlier, the total measurement of the Dhaka University library was 140,750 square feet. It is constructed out of bricks and cement with wide windows and space.

== History ==
The library began in 1921 with 877 students, 60 teachers of 12 departments under three faculties: art, science and law. Then the library was placed in the premises of Dhaka Medical College and Hospital and later it was transferred on the ground floor of a building situated at the north bank of the pond of Curzon Hall premises. Later, the library was transferred inro the present Central Library Building. The former principal of Dhaka College was the first librarian of the Dhaka University Library.

== Administrative building ==
The Administration section, manuscripts, reprography, acquisition, processing, periodicals, accounts, Binding, seminar, old Newspaper section, resource centre for the visually impaired students and cyber centre are housed in the administrative building.

== Main building ==
Reader Service section, Planning and Development, Information Technology Section are housed in the main building.

== Science building ==
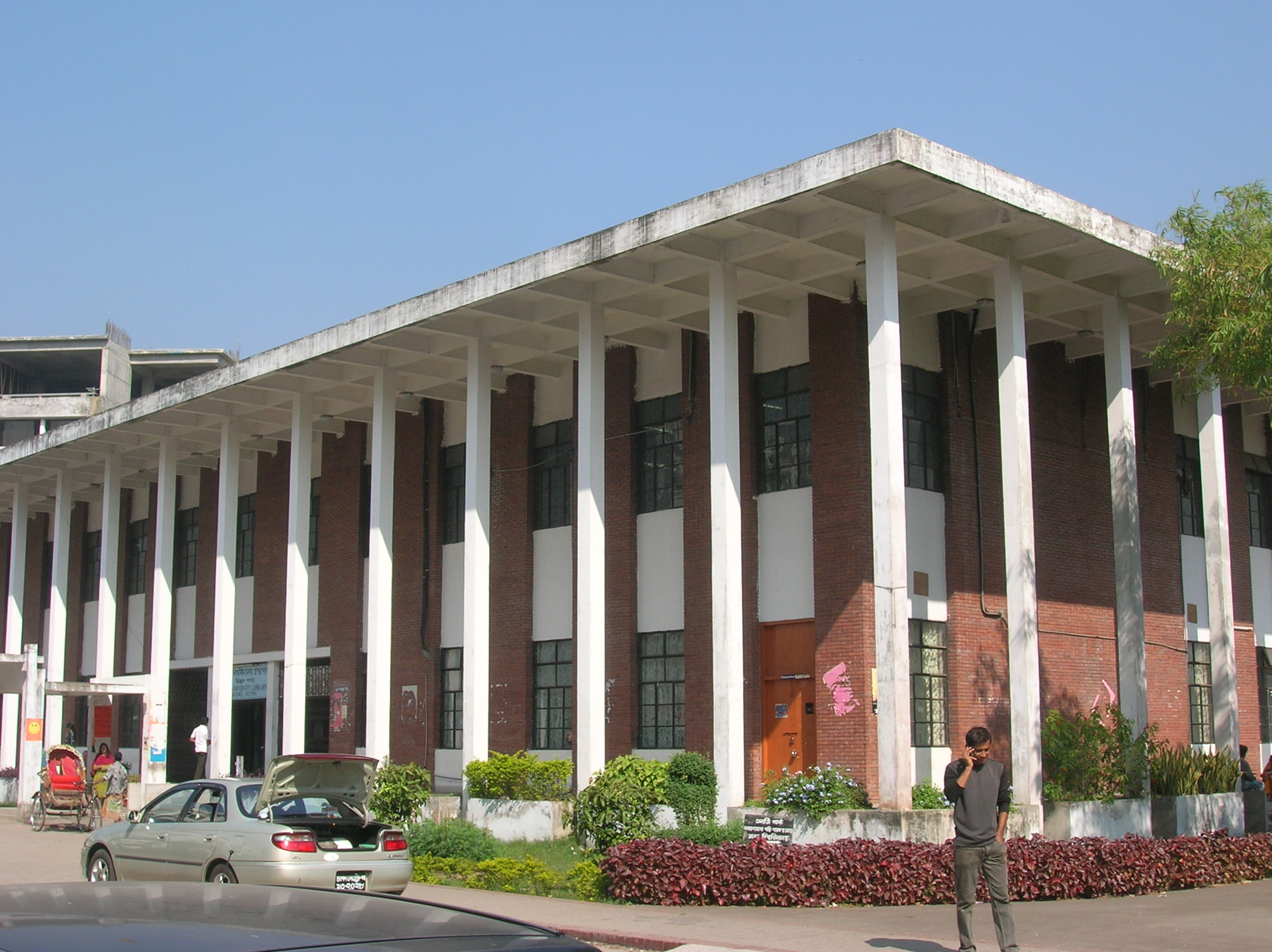
Science building

There are 4 reading rooms in the first floor of the Science building. About 400 students can read at a time. The reading rooms are air-conditioned. There is also a reference room in the first floor. Teachers, researchers and students can use these and reference tools here. There are separate seating arrangements for teachers. Teachers, researchers, registered graduates, officers and employees can issue 10 books, 3 books for 14 days.

A complaint box is kept in every floor of the Main building and Science building for readers. They can lodge any complaint in the box to redress the grievances. Those boxes are opened every week and necessary action taken accordingly. Besides, there is a senior officer in every floor who acts as a floor in charge. Readers can inform him about any sorts of problems for early solution. If he fails, readers can ventilate the same to the librarian for taking necessary action.

== Present condition ==
The library has now 621,058 volume of books and bound journals. Moreover, it has over 30,000 rare and old manuscripts, numerous microfilms and microfiches. The collection of this institution is increasing gradually day by day. 3,188 books were received as donation and 187 titles of journals are added 2007-2008 alone. An amount of Tk. 9.9 million was allocated in the budget for procurement of books and journals in that academic year. The budget is obtained every year from the government of Bangladesh through the UGC. Nevertheless, it may be pointed out here that necessary books and journals cannot be procured as per the requirements of the various departments due to the paucity of funds. And most of the student are come here to read government job related study.

== See also ==
- Dhaka University Film Society
