= Sri Sri Bura Shivdham =

Hindu temple in Dhaka, Bangladesh

- শ্রী শ্রী বুড়া শিবধাম
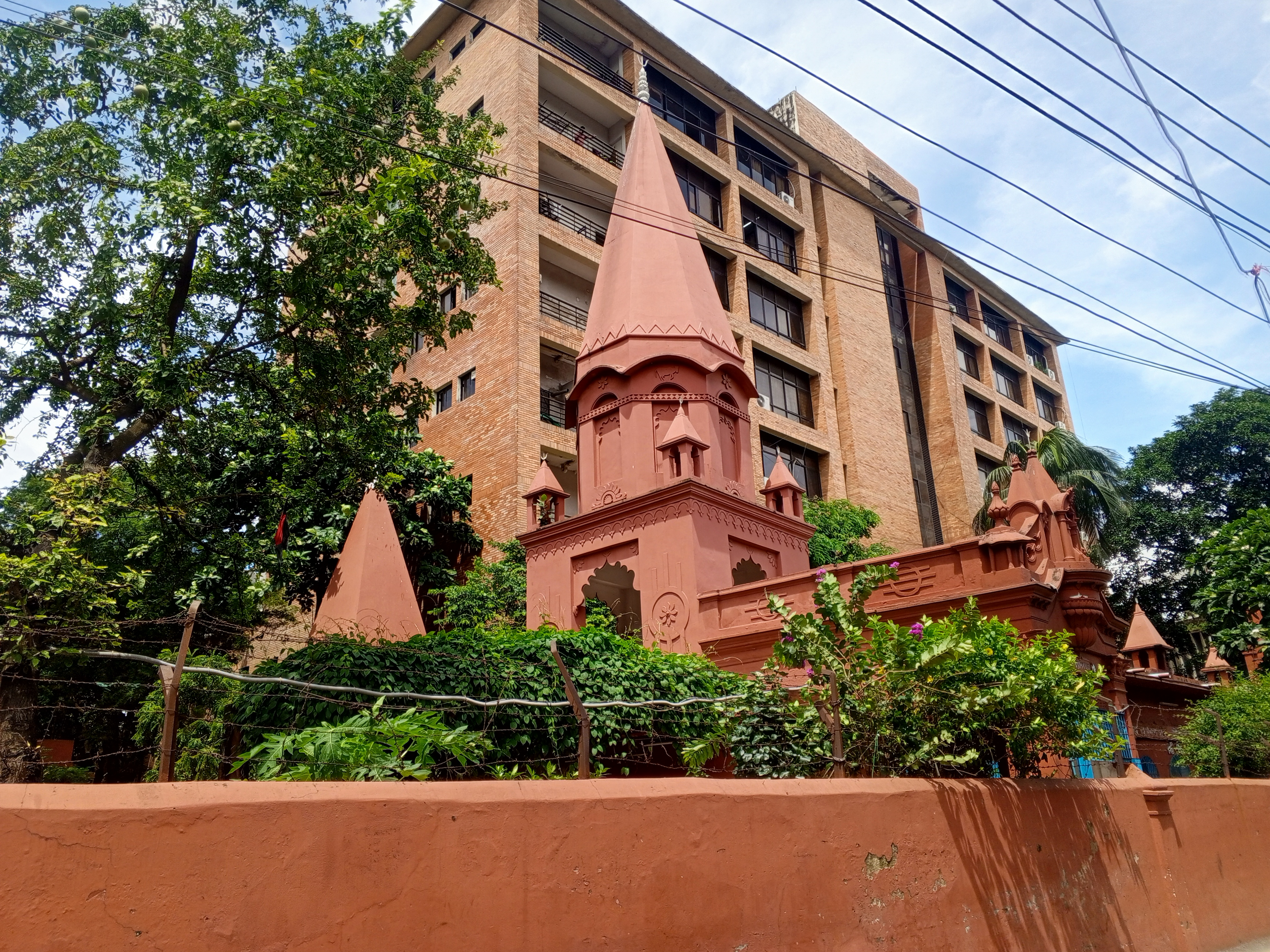

Religion
- Affiliation: Hinduism
- Deity: Shiva
- Festival: Shivaratri
- Status: Active

Location
- Location: North of the Central Shaheed Minar, Dhaka
- Country: Bangladesh
- Interactive map of Sri Sri Bura Shivdham
- Coordinates: 23°43′46″N 90°23′46″E

Architecture
- Founder: Raja Sir Bijay Chand Mahtab (Reconstruction)
- Established: Between 1605 to 1627

Sri Sri Bura Shivdham or Shivbari is a Hindu temple located north of the Central Shaheed Minar in Dhaka, Bangladesh. The temple features a tall red spire and is adorned with elaborate ornamentation. The locality around the temple is called Shibbari, taking its name from this temple. It is considered one of Dhaka’s oldest, largest, and most beautiful temples.

== History ==
The temple was originally constructed during the reign of Mughal Emperor Jahangir (1605–1627), making it nearly five centuries old. In 1912, a severe storm heavily damaged the temple. It was later reconstructed by Raja Sir Bijay Chand Mahtab of Burdwan, a devotee of Shiva. At that time, the Raja of Burdwan was residing in the Burdwan House located behind the Shiva temple. During this period, the King and Queen of Nepal are said to have visited this Shiva temple. In 1971, during the Bangladesh Liberation War, Pakistani army forces killed the temple’s caretaker and several Hindu ascetics (sadhus) associated with the temple.

== Temple complex ==
The temple complex includes a nata mandir and several smaller shrines dedicated to Shiva.

== Festivals ==
Major festivals celebrated at Sri Sri Bura Shivdham include Maha Shivaratri and other Hindu religious festivals.

== Gallery ==
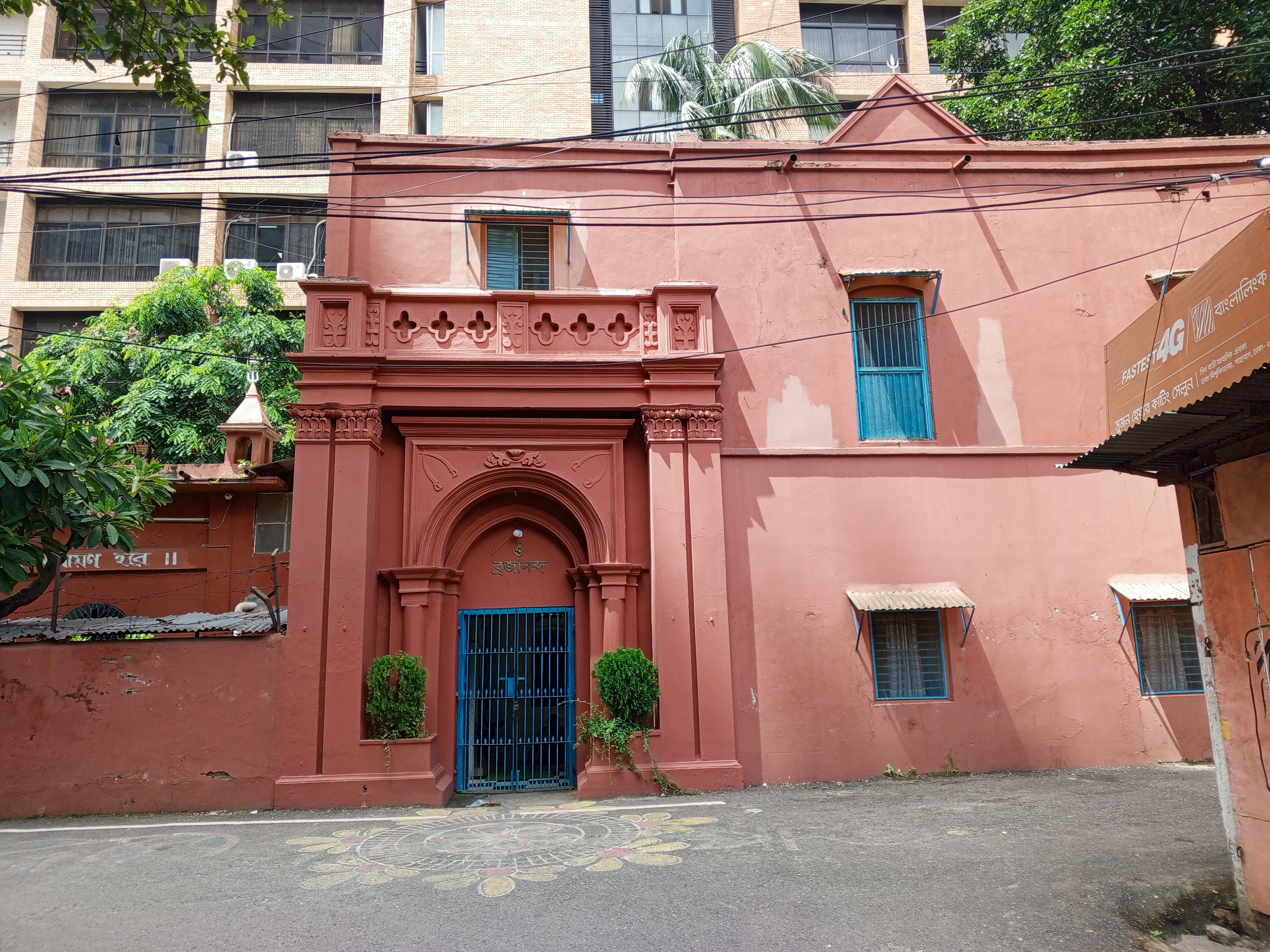
Main gate

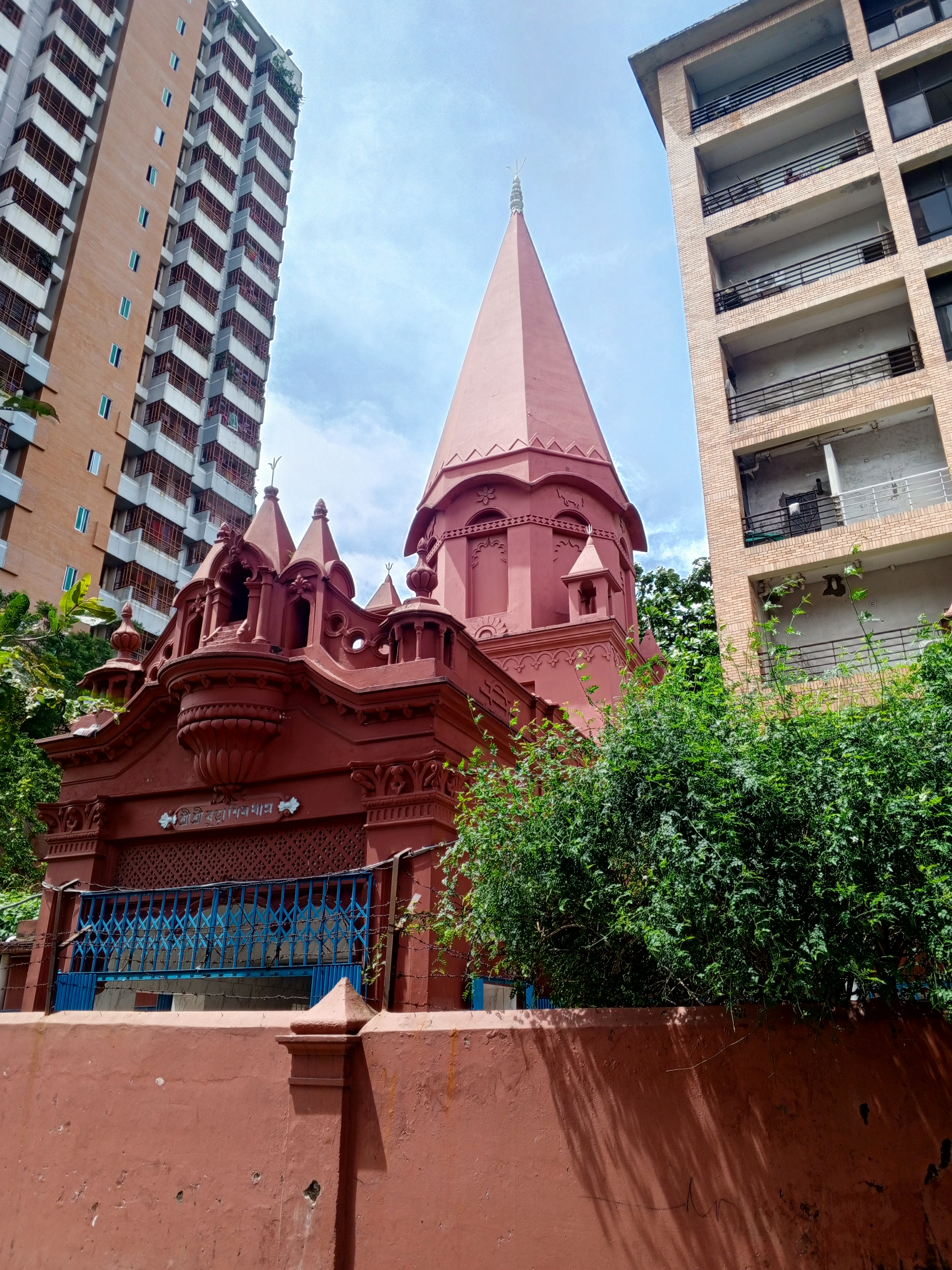

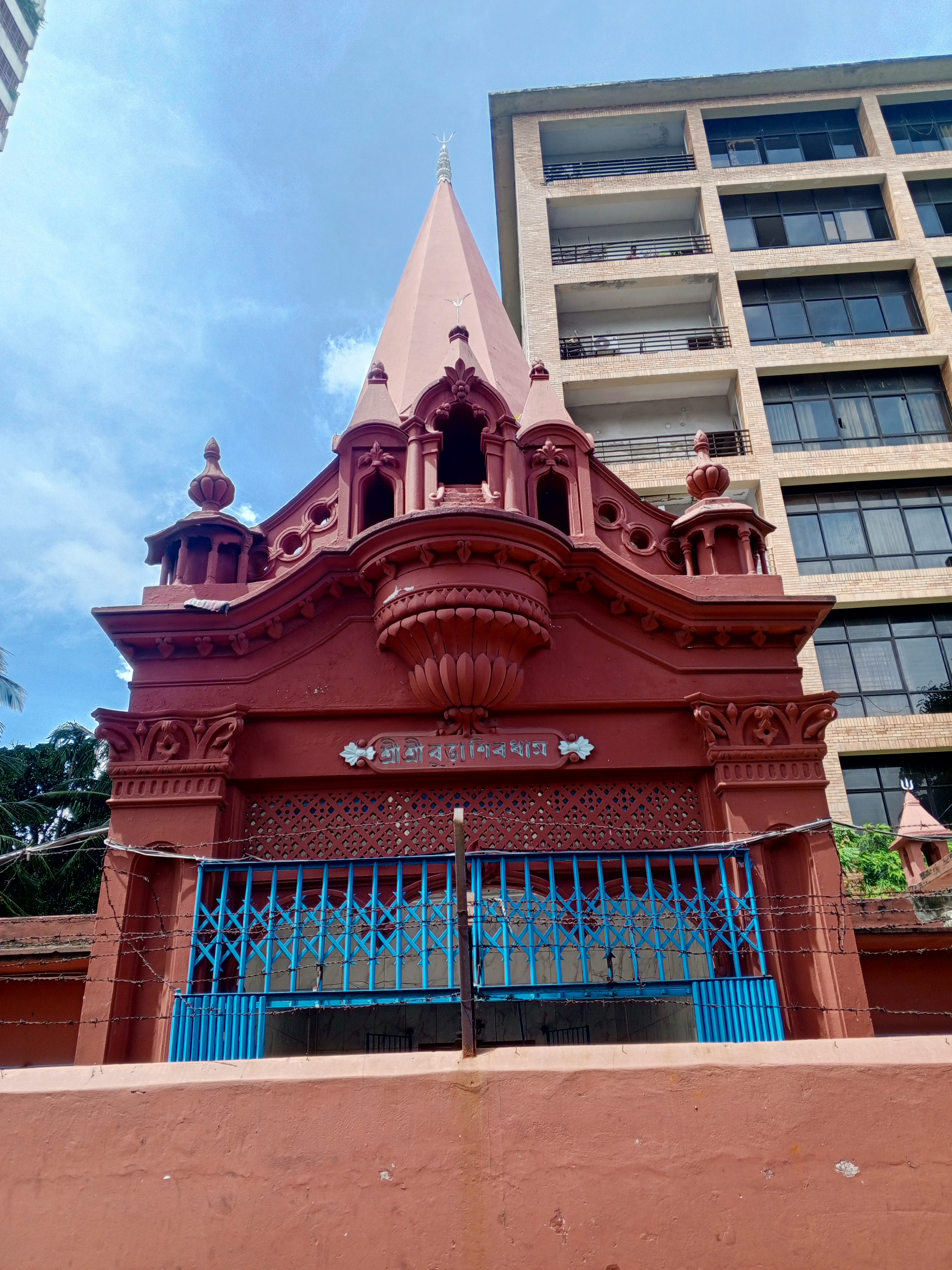

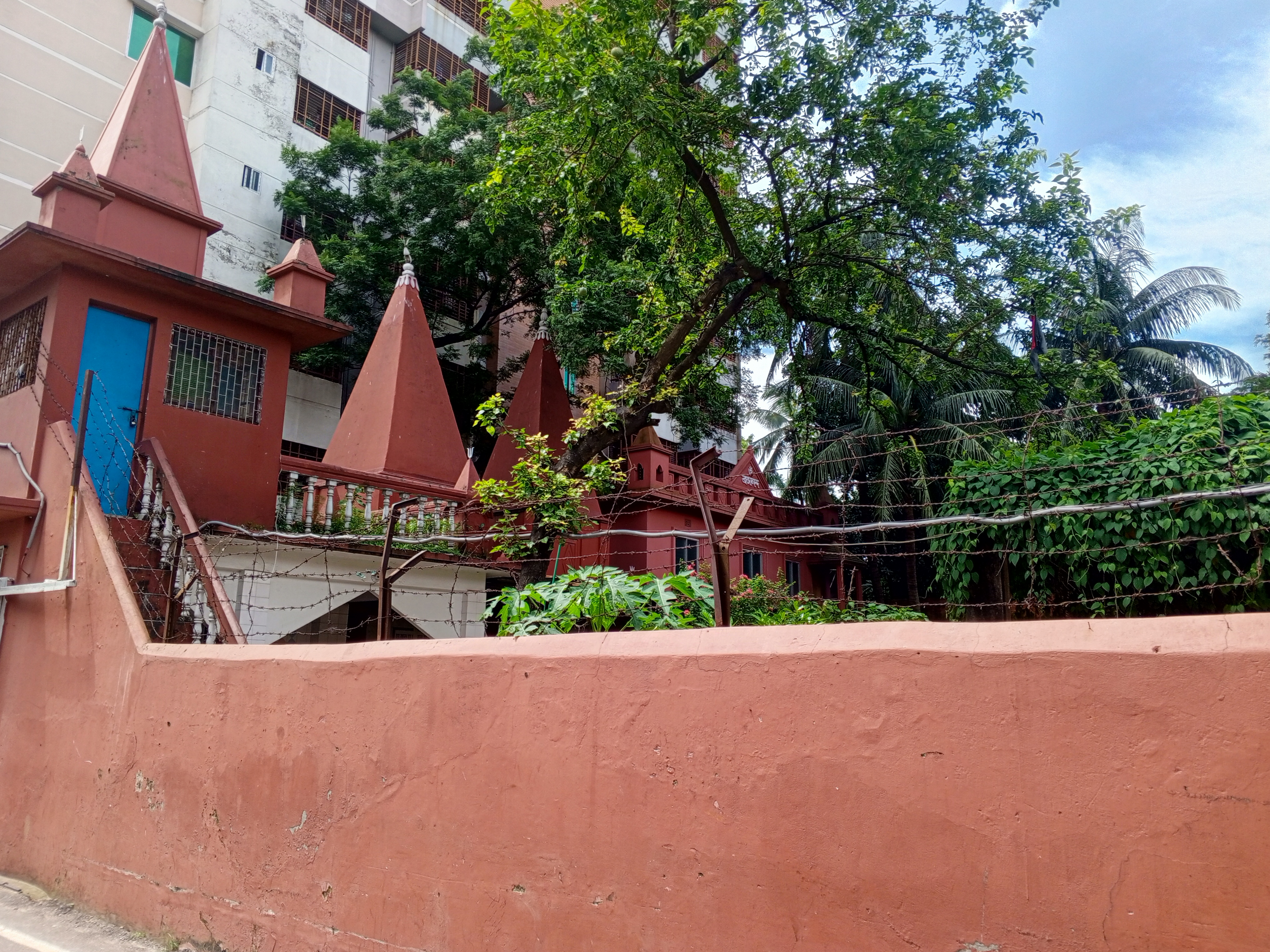

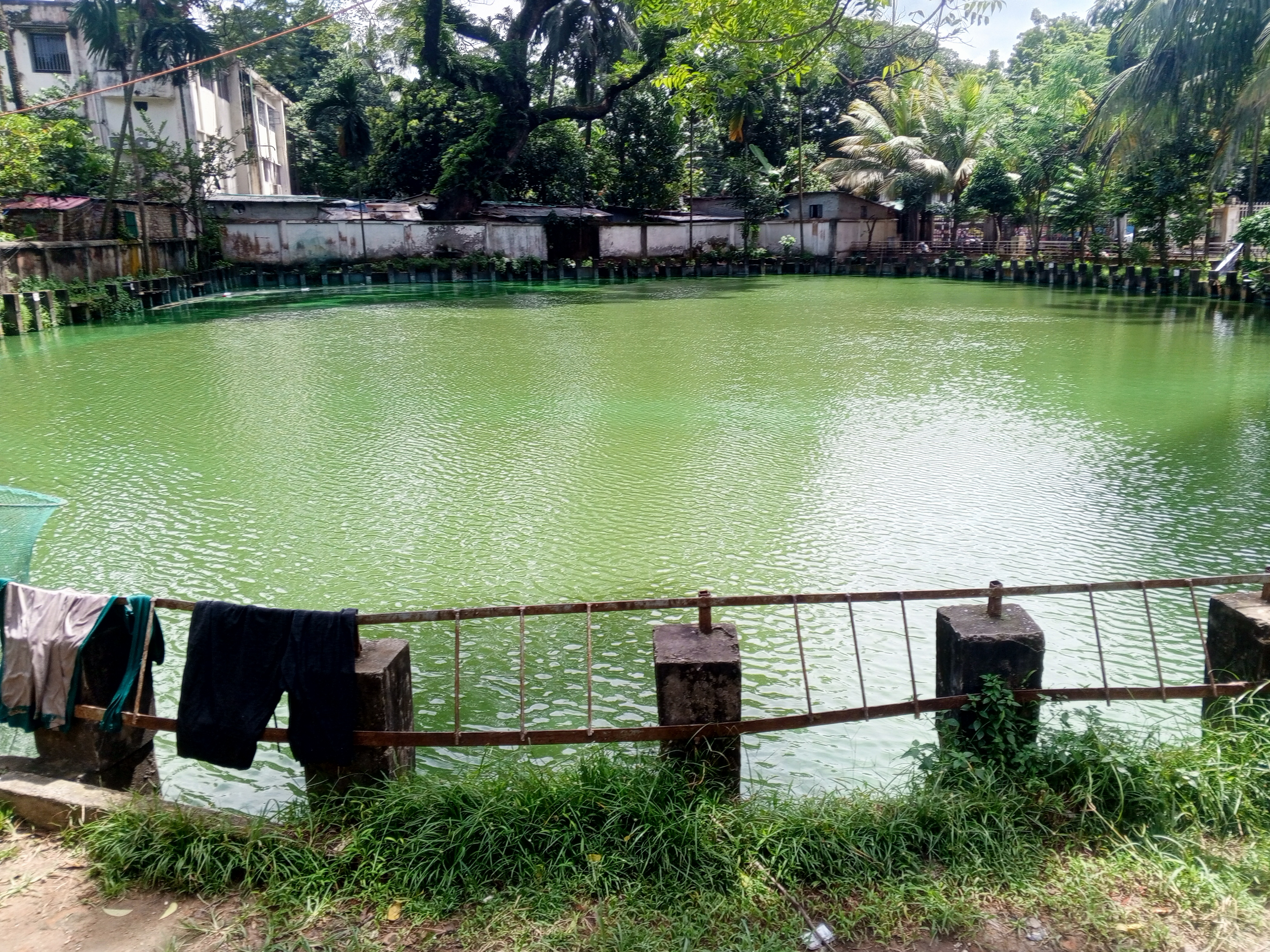
Front pond
