= National Academy for Educational Management =

- Motto: Teacher for Quality Education
- Type: Training Academy
- Established: 1959
- Administrative staff: 142
- Location: Dhaka, Bangladesh
- Campus: 8 acres (32,000 m^{2})
- Affiliations: Ministry of Education (Bangladesh)
- Website: naem.gov.bd

National Academy for Educational Management (NAEM) is an affiliated academy to the Ministry of Education, Bangladesh. This academy is dedicated to conducting training on education management, research and planning to ensure quality education in the country. NAEM provides in-service training to the heads of secondary schools, principals of colleges and education administrators for enhancing their professional efficiency in educational planning and management in order to achieve their institutional objectives.

== History ==
The metamorphosis of NAEM dates back to 1959 when it was established as Education Extension Centre. After the emergence of Bangladesh, the centre was upgraded and entitled as Bangladesh Education Extension and Research Institute (BEERI) in 1975. The BEERI was entrusted with additional responsibility for research and management training of education functionaries including college and Madrasa teachers and administrators.

== See also ==
- Ministry of Education (Bangladesh)
