= Daroga Amir Uddin Mosque =

Mosque in Babu Bazar, Dhaka, Bangladesh

Daroga Amir Uddin Mosque Ghat Mosque
- Babubazar Ghat Jame Masjid (বাবুবাজার ঘাট জামে মসজিদ)
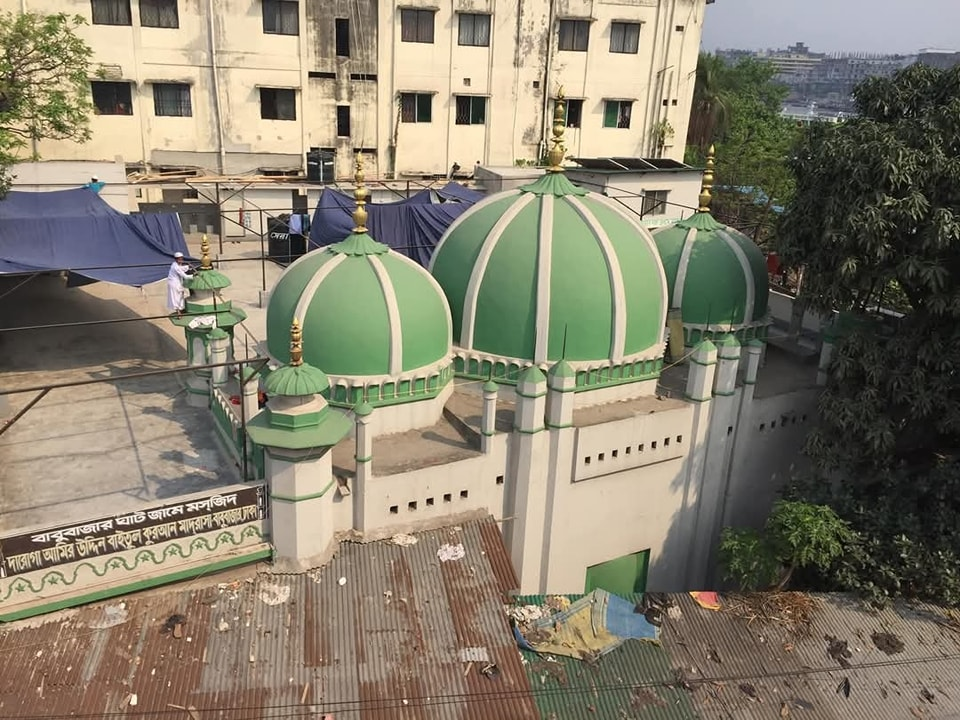
- The mosque in its present state

- Location of the mosque in Old Dhaka

Religion
- Affiliation: Islam
- Status: Intact

Location
- Location: Dhaka, Bangladesh
- Country: Bangladesh
- Interactive map of Daroga Amir Uddin Mosque; Ghat Mosque
- Coordinates: 23.7101°N 90.4027°E

Architecture
- Style: Mughal
- Completed: 1840

Specifications
- Capacity: 1500
- Minaret: 3
- Materials: Brick, Lime, Mosaic

Daroga Amir Uddin Mosque (Bengali: দারোগা আমির উদ্দিন মসজিদ, romanized: Dārogā Āmīr Uddīn Mośjid) is a three-domed mosque located in Babu Bazar, Dhaka, Bangladesh, on the banks of the Buriganga River. Locally known as the Ghat Mosque (Bengali: ঘাট মসজিদ, lit. 'riverbank steps mosque'), the structure has stood for almost two centuries in Old Dhaka. The mosque compound includes the founder's mausoleum and an adjacent cemetery.

== History ==
The mosque was possibly constructed around 1840 by "Daroga" Amir Uddin, (Note: Born in 1818 in the Ruposhdi village of Brahmanbaria, Amir Uddin is believed to have come from an affluent family who accumulated more wealth through his service with the Company. According to his descendants and the inscription from his tomb, his real title was "Dwarka" (Bengali: দ্বারকা) and not "Daroga". However, the latter endured.) who is said to have been a daroga (police inspector) in the service of the British East India Company. Along with the mosque, he constructed a palace-like residential building, which no longer exists, due to erosion of the river bank. Parts of the mosque compound were absorbed into the Badamtoli terminal in the past. The mosque is now largely obscured by nearby structures, with only its domes visible from afar.

== Architecture ==
The mosque and the mausoleum borrow elements from Mughal architectural style and represent the heritage of traditional Islamic building design in Bengal.

The total area of the mosque compound is 34.90 decimal or around 15,200 square feet.

=== Main structure ===
The main mosque measures 15.24 meters in length and 8.23 meters in width. The structure features three domes, with the central dome being larger than the two flanking ones, which are equal in size. Originally constructed with lime and brick dust (chun-surki), the domes were likely in their natural brick-red color with white accents. Following recent renovations, they now display a green finish. The mosque is adorned with four corner towers (buruj) and features two slender minarets between them. The domes, towers, and minarets are topped with brass finials and decorative spires that gleam in the sunlight.

=== Entrances and interior ===
The eastern wall contains three entrance doors, with the central one being larger than the side entrances. All doors feature semi-circular arches.

The main mihrab has been renovated with green and brown marble cladding, while the floor features marble chip mosaic work.

=== Prayer capacity ===
The main mosque accommodates three rows of worshippers, with the veranda providing space for four additional rows. Recent expansions have added more prayer space in front of and on both sides of the veranda, creating seven more rows. The total capacity now accommodates approximately 1,500 worshippers.

=== Mausoleum and cemetery ===
North of the mosque stands the single-domed mausoleum of Amir Uddin, also constructed in Mughal architectural style. The tomb inscription reads "Morhum Moulvi Dwarka Amir Uddin" with his birth and death years (1818–1888). Surrounding the mausoleum is a cemetery where many permanent residents of area around the mosque have been buried over the years. The cemetery area has been developed as a garden-like space with various fruit trees including mango, jackfruit, neem, and custard apple trees, creating a serene and shaded environment enclosed by low iron grills.

== Modern administration and challenges ==
=== Current management ===
The mosque is administered through a Waqf Trust. As of 2024, the current Mutawalli (trustee) is Md. Sharafat Ali, and the General Secretary of the management committee is Md. Aminul Islam.

=== Educational facilities ===
In 2018, a Nurani Hifzkhana (Quranic memorization school) and maktab were established under a tin shed on the northwest side of the mosque. According to Imam Maulana Md. Ammar Hossain, approximately 150 students currently study there. The mosque committee is able to provide daily iftar for about 250 people, including students and general community members.

=== Land disputes and encroachment ===
Significant portions of the mosque's southern and western areas were acquired by Bangladesh Inland Water Transport Corporation (BIWTC) during the construction of the Second Buriganga Bridge. However, these were largely recovered.

=== Preservation efforts ===
There is no government incentive to protect the mosque and other structures. The current management committee faces challenges from influential groups attempting to demolish the historic structure to build a new mosque and multi-story commercial complex. Local residents and the committee are working to prevent this destruction while planning to establish a madrasa on the remaining land while preserving the invaluable ancient structure.
