= Mill Barrack =

Coordinates: 23.700°N 90.419°E

Mill Barrack (Bengali: মিল ব্যারাক) is a former military barracks situated at Gendaria, Dhaka, Bangladesh, currently occupied by the Range Reserve Force of the Dhaka Metropolitan Police. After the Indian Rebellion of 1857 it held the forces that had been located at Lalbagh Fort. It held one of two police training schools that were set up in Bengal in 1903, and is now used for training traffic police.

== History ==
The Dacca Sugar Works Company established a sugar mill on the site in the 1840s. The enterprise was unsuccessful, and closed in the early 1850s. The building was sold in 1856 to British merchant William Foley, who used it as a combination residence and warehouse. During the Indian Rebellion of 1857 it became a temporary barracks for British reinforcements from Calcutta. Since then the building and surrounding neighborhood have been known as Mill Barrack. After 1905, there was a Police Training Camp for a long time.

== Architectural value and present condition ==
The place became a Police Lines, which was established in 1898. Its area around 25,000 sq. meters. It contains 5 buildings. The 1st building is two Storeyed Traffic Training Building. 2nd building is Ration Store and 3rd building contains ammunition storage. Both these buildings are two storey. The other 2 buildings are Barrack of Police Force and Staff & Administrative building, which are 3 storeyed.
