= Robert G. Boughey =

American architect

- Born: June 20, 1936 (age 90); Pottsville, Pennsylvania, US
- Education: Pratt Institute
- Spouse: Farida Majid (divorced)

Robert George Boughey (born June 20, 1936) is an American architect who has worked primarily in Dhaka and Bangkok.

Born in Pennsylvania, he completed his Bachelor of Architecture from Pratt Institute in New York in 1959, after which he worked for Louis Berger, Inc., overseeing its projects in East Pakistan (now Bangladesh) and Thailand.

In 1962, he began teaching at the newly established architecture program of East Pakistan University of Engineering and Technology (later Bangladesh University of Engineering and Technology).

He received a diploma in Tropical Studies from AA School of Architecture in London in 1967, and worked as a research professor of architecture at Pratt institute, before settling in Bangkok in 1973, where he established the firm Robert G. Boughey and Associates.

He is regarded as a member of the pioneering generation of architects in Thailand who saw the field's development into an institutionalized profession.

== Notable works ==
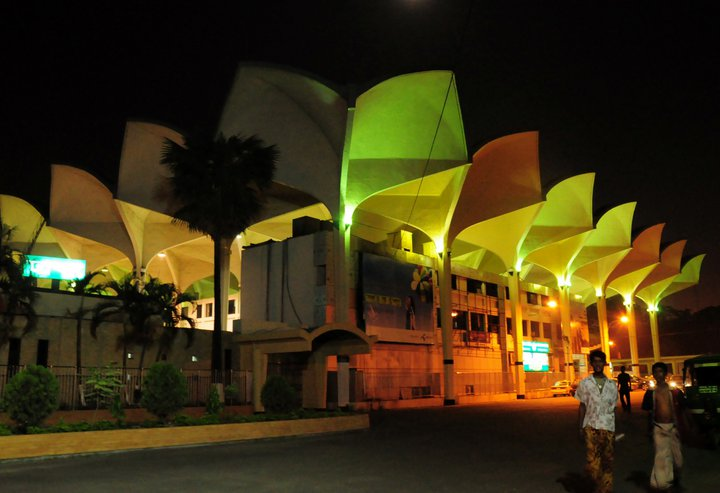
Kamalapur Railway Station

- National Museum of Bangladesh, Dhaka
- Kamalapur Railway Station, Dhaka, 1961–64
- Bangladesh University of Engineering and Technology (BUET), Dhaka
  - Shaheed Suhrawardi Hall
  - Sher-e-Bangla Hall
  - Titumir Hall, 1962-1964
  - Gymnasium, 1964
  - Academic Building, Department of Civil Engineering, 1965
- Priests and Seminarians Residence, Notre Dame College, Dhaka, 1963-1964
- Saint Joseph Higher Secondary School, Dhaka, 1963-1964
- Holy Family Hospital's sisters' Hostel, Dhaka, 1963-1965
- Indoor Stadium Huamark, Bangkok, 1965–66
- Don Mueang International Airport Domestic Terminal, Bangkok, 1982
- Bank of America, Bangkok
- Diethelm Towers, Bangkok
- SCB Park Plaza, Bangkok
- The Boughey Residence, Bangkok
- Bangkok Art and Culture Centre, Bangkok
