= Binat Bibi Mosque =

Mosque in Narinda, Dhaka, Bangladesh

- বিনত বিবির মসজিদ
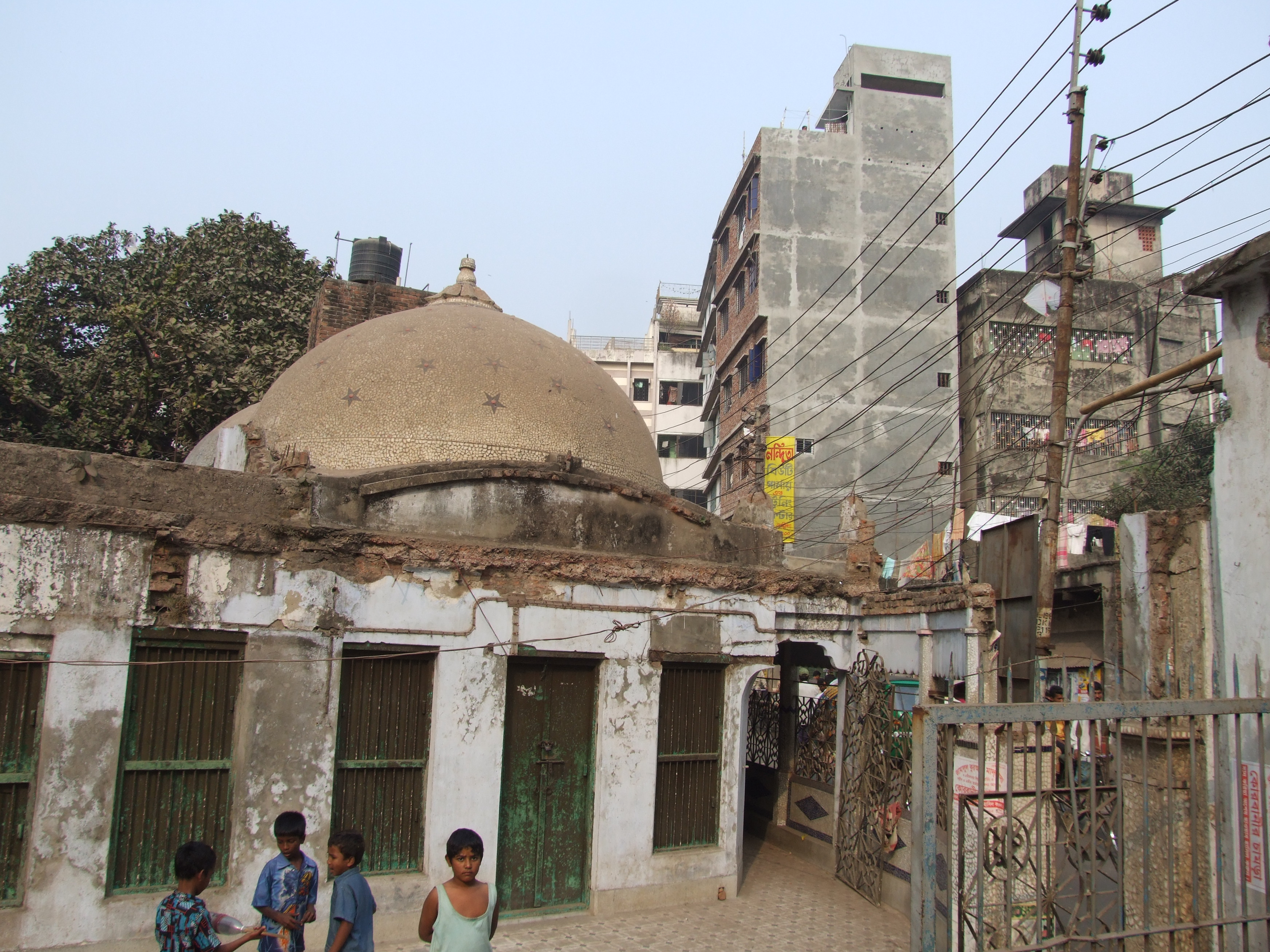
- Binat Bibi Mosque in 2007

- Location within Dhaka

Religion
- Affiliation: Islam
- Status: active

Location
- Location: Narinda, Dhaka, Bangladesh
- Coordinates: 23°42′40″N 90°25′05″E

Architecture
- Type: mosque

Binat Bibi Mosque is the earliest surviving mosque in Dhaka, built in 1454 by Bakht Binat, the daughter of Marhamat. It was built during the rule of the Sultan of Bengal, Nasiruddin Mahmud Shah (1435–1459). The mosque is located beside the Hayat Bepari's Bridge in the Narinda area.

The mosque is a square, single-domed building measuring 12 feet (3.7 m) square internally with a single hemispherical dome at the top of the square room. Entrances are from the east, north, and south. Pre-Mughal features included the curved cornices and battlements, corner octagonal turrets, and arches on the southern, northern, and eastern sides. The ornamentation is modest, and the building is coated with plaster.

A portion of the mosque is being demolished as part of a renovation plan that includes building a 70-foot (21 m) high minaret and extending the current building from three stories to seven.

== Structure ==
The mosque is a square, single domed mosque measuring 12 feet (3.7 m) square internally with a single hemispherical dome atop the square room. Entrances are from the east, north, and south. Pre-Mughal features included the curved cornices and battlements, corner octagonal turrets, and arches on the southern, northern, and eastern sides. The ornamentation is modest, and the building is coated with plaster. There is a stone inscription of the mosque written in Persian, which is located on the north of the mosque where Binat Bakht is buried. The wall thickness is approximately 1.82m. The mihrab had a projection at the back of the west wall.

The single-dome mosque over time was turned into a rectangular shape by breaking down the southern wall and extending to the south. Further, a new dome was added around 1932. In 1962, towards the western side, a new mihrab was built. With time the original pre-Mughal features were changed; the outer facade of the western veranda, the northern wall, the dome and the side walls of the waterbody were decorated with traditional vernacular chinitukri work (ceramic or glass shard tiling). The renovated walls didn't have the original structure thickness; hence the existing structure can be identified. Currently the only pre-Boburids features are the inscription, the eastern wall, the northern wall, the original dome, and the curved cornice.

== Current state ==
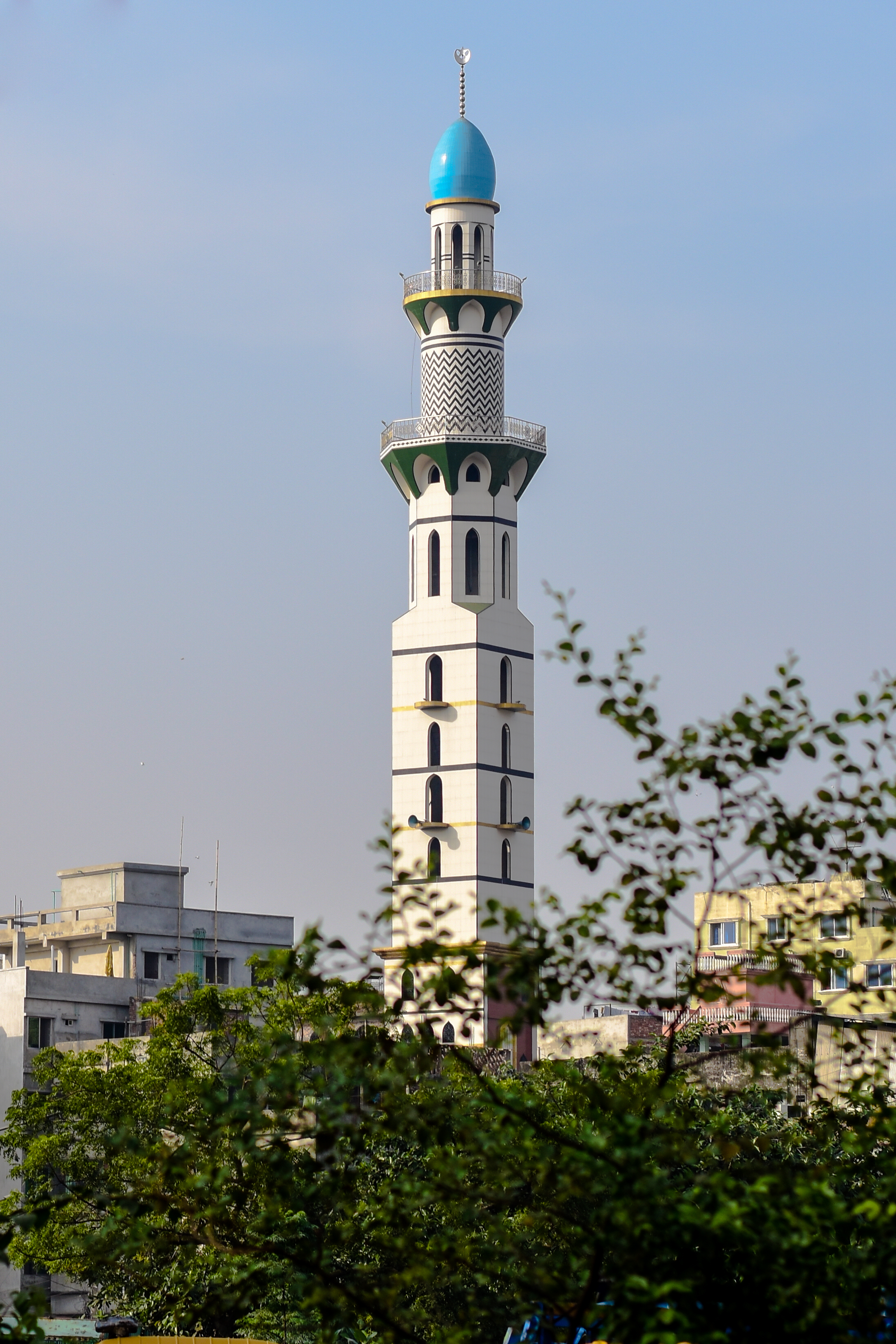
The blue minaret (2020)

Part of the mosque is being demolished as part of a renovation plan which includes building a 70-foot (21 m) high minaret, and the extension of the current building from three stories to seven.

== See also ==
- Islam in Bangladesh
- List of mosques in Bangladesh
