= Shahidullah =

Shahidullah means "witness of Allah". It may refer to:

== People ==
=== Given name ===
- Shah Shahidullah Faridi (1915–1978), English writer
- Shahidullah Kaiser (1927–1971), Bangladeshi novelist
- Shahidullah (cricketer) (born 1999), Afghan cricketer

=== Surname ===
- Muhammad Shahidullah (disambiguation), multiple people

== Places ==
- Shahidulla (Xaidulla, Saitula), settlement on the old caravan route between Ladakh and Yarkand, now in Chinese Xinjiang

== Others ==
- Shahidullah Hall, a residential hall of the University of Dhaka
