= Aftab Uddin Bhuiyan =

Bangladeshi politician

Advocate Aftab Uddin Bhuiyan

Member of 1st Jatiya Sangsad
- In office 1973–1976
- Succeeded by: Mohammad Shahidullah
- Constituency: Dhaka-24

Personal details
- Died: 6 October 1995
- Party: Awami League

Aftab Uddin Bhuiyan (Bengali: আফতাব উদ্দিন ভূঁইয়া; died 6 October 1995) was an Awami League politician in Bangladesh and a former member of parliament for Dhaka-24.

== Career ==
Bhuiyan was a lawyer. He was elected to parliament from Dhaka-24 as an Awami League candidate in 1973.

== Death ==
Bhuiyan died on 6 October 1995.
