= Dhaka College =

Public boys' college in Dhaka, Bangladesh

Coordinates: 23°44′07.5″N 90°22′59.5″E

- ঢাকা কলেজ
- Logo of Dhaka College
- Other name: DC
- Former names: Dacca Central College; Dacca Government College; Dacca College
- Motto: Know Thyself
- Type: Public Men's college
- Established: 20 November 1841; 185 years ago
- Parent institution: Dhaka Central University
- Affiliations: Dhaka Education Board
- Chancellor: President of Bangladesh
- Vice-Chancellor: Md. Lutfor Rahaman
- Principal: AKM Elias
- Academic staff: 200+
- Administrative staff: 150+
- Students: 25000+
- Location: Mirpur Road, New Market Thana, Dhaka, 1205, Bangladesh
- Campus: 18.57 acres (7.52 ha); City
- Colors
- Nickname: DCians
- Website: dhakacollege.edu.bd

Dhaka College (Bengali: ঢাকা কলেজ), informally known as DC, is a public educational institution of Bangladesh located in New Market, Dhaka. Established in 1841, it is one of the oldest educational institutions in the subcontinent. It offers Higher Secondary Certificate under Dhaka Education Board and honours and master's programs under Dhaka Central University.

== History ==
The East India Company and British rule were closely related to the spread of modern education in the subcontinent. In 1780, during the Company rule, the rulers established the Calcutta Madrasah (now Aliah University), and 1791, they established the Sanskrit College in Varanasi for Indians, and the Fort William College in 1800 for the employees of the East India Company.

Following the passage of the 'Charter Act 1813', the East India Company was instructed by the British government to focus on the education of Indians. The act was the foundation of modern Indian education. Hindu College (now Presidency University) was established in 1817.

Various debates were held about the means and methods of spreading education in India. In 1835, a member of the British Parliament, Thomas Babington Macaulay, proposed in the 'Minute on Education' that India's education should be in the English language and in the light of European knowledge. As a result, the Governor General of India, Lord William Bentinck, gave the English Education Act 1835 effect. The General Committee of Public Instruction, the government body responsible for education at the time, recommended in a report submitted to Bentinck on 20 April 1835 that schools be established in major cities under the Bengal Presidency to teach English literature and science. They also recommended to allocate money from the government fund for establishing such schools wherever possible and to start the programme from Dhaka and Patna.

Later, George Eden, 1st Earl of Auckland, the Governor General of India, presented a Minute on Education in 1839, following which the General Committee of Public Instruction proposed the establishment of a college in Dhaka to the Governor General in 1840. The proposal was approved on July 18, 1841. On November 20, 1841, Dacca Central College was established. University of Cambridge student and Hindu College (now Presidency University, Kolkata) teacher J. Ireland was appointed the first Principal.

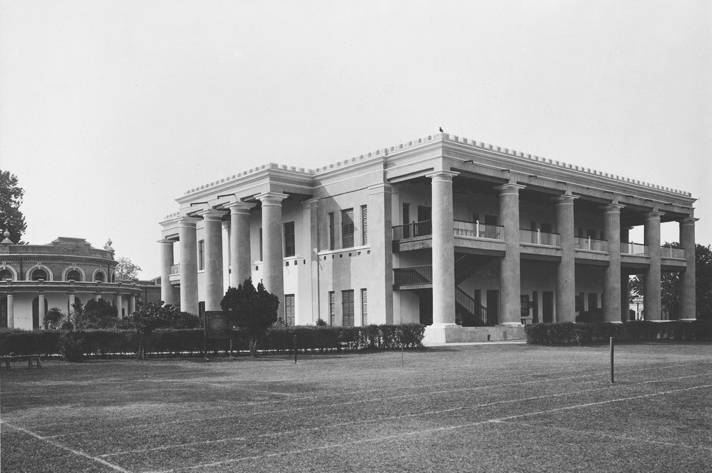
Dhaka College in 1904 (located at Dhaka Collegiate School premise). Photographer: Fritz Kapp. Source: British Library.

Dhaka College started with three rooms on the second floor of the English Seminary School (now Dhaka Collegiate School) building. The local Public Education Committee bought the land for the college building. John Henry Garstin designed the building. On November 20, 1841, Daniel Wilson, Bishop of Calcutta, laid the foundation stone of the college at Sadarghat. The construction of the building was completed in 1844 and on May 25, 1844, the students started their education in the new building. In the first graduating class there were both Muslim and Hindu students, as well as a number of foreign students, mainly from Armenia and Portugal. Since its inception, Dhaka College has been an important educational institution in Bangladesh for leading the cultural, social and intellectual activities of East Bengal.

It was renamed Dacca College in 1846.

In 1854, due to Wood's dispatch by Charles Wood, 1st Viscount Halifax, discipline and coordination was established in Indian education. Due to the new educational policy, since 1854 students of Dhaka College can study medicine at Calcutta Medical College, the only medical college in the subcontinent that time.

After the establishment of Calcutta University in 1857, Dhaka College was affiliated to it. In the first year, 4 students were sent from Dhaka College to appear in the BA examination, although one student appeared in the examination named Dinanath Sen (দীননাথ সেন).

In 1873, the college was relocated to a building to the east of Victoria Park to accommodate the increased number of students and the physics and chemistry laboratories. In 1875, a separate science building was established and science classes were opened in Dhaka College. Dhaka College became important to education in East Bengal by providing higher education in philosophy, history, literature, mathematics, law and science - which continued until the establishment of Dhaka University in 1921.

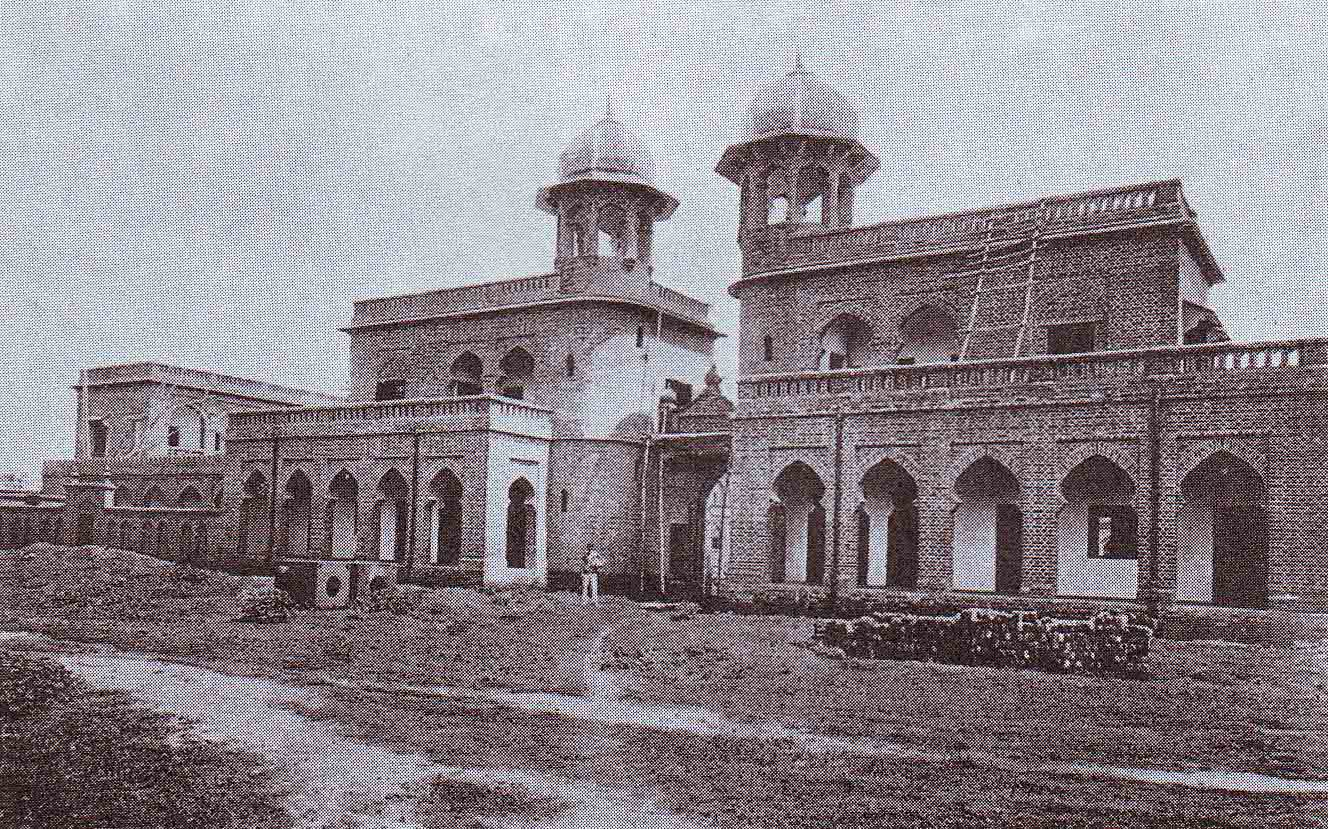
First modern designed student hall of Dhaka College (1908), now known as Dr. Muhammad Shahidullah Hall of University of Dhaka

There was no dormitory in Dhaka College until 1880. Subsequently, the first dormitory named Rajchandra Hindu Student Hostel was constructed at Shridas Lane, Bangla Bazar for Dhaka College in 1880 with a completely private grant subject to the permission of the government.

In 1903 new infrastructure plans were made for Dhaka College and in 1904 land was acquired and construction work started. On February 19, 1904, Lord Curzon inaugurated the construction of Curzon Hall. At a government meeting on May 27, 1904, it was decided to build a modern dormitory for Dhaka College. In 1908, construction of Curzon Hall was completed and Dhaka College was shifted to Curzon Hall and some adhering buildings at Ramna area after the partition of Bengal. The road on the east of Curzon Hall was named as College Road when Dhaka College was here. In March 1908, the construction of Dhaka Hall (now Shahidullah Hall) was completed.

World War I resulted in the declination of academic activities and other development works at the college. In July 1920, another college named Dacca Intermediate College was founded comprising the intermediate classes of Dhaka College for strategical reasons. On August 20, 1920, the new college was moved to the then Engineering School (now BUET) campus. Only the remaining BA, BSc, MA and MSc classes were accommodated in Curzon Hall.

On July 1, 1921, the University of Dhaka was established. A section of Dhaka College was merged with the newly created university. In fact, all the movable and immovable properties of Dhaka College, students, teachers, staffs, employees, books, library, science rooms and various buildings were brought under the university so that the university could start its academic activities on July 15, 1921. A large amount of college land and campus, hostels and other infrastructures, scientific equipment and various scholarships allotted to meritorious students were also handed over to the university.

The college itself moved to the Residence of Lieutenant Governor (Old High Court Building) and the Engineering School (now BUET) building was made the student hostel of the college. The Engineering School (now BUET) was moved to Secretariat building. In 1943, the High Court College building had to be vacated to rehabilitate the wounded soldiers of World War II. The armed forces occupied the building. Then the college was shifted temporarily to Islamic Intermediate College (now Kabi Nazrul Govt. College) located in Luxmibazar. Shortly afterwards, the official and academic activities of the college were conducted in a rusty old private building of late Khan Bahadur Abdul Hai located in Siddiq Bazar, adjacent to Fulbaria Station.

In 1955, the journey of Dhaka College was started anew with new infrastructures in the present campus at New Market area with a land area of 24 acres. In 1972, undergraduate courses on some subjects were reopened.

During the Ershad period, the college had to relinquish about 6 acres of land.At present, the college is situated on 18.57 acres.

=== Affiliations ===
University	From	To	Notes
University of Calcutta	July 18, 1857	July 1, 1921	
University of Dhaka	July 1, 1921	October 20, 1992	
National University, Bangladesh	October 21, 1992	February 15, 2017	
University of Dhaka	February 16, 2017	January 27, 2025	

== Academics ==
Dhaka College offers two years of Higher Secondary, four years of Honours and one year of Master's courses in various disciplines.

== Facilities ==
=== Library ===
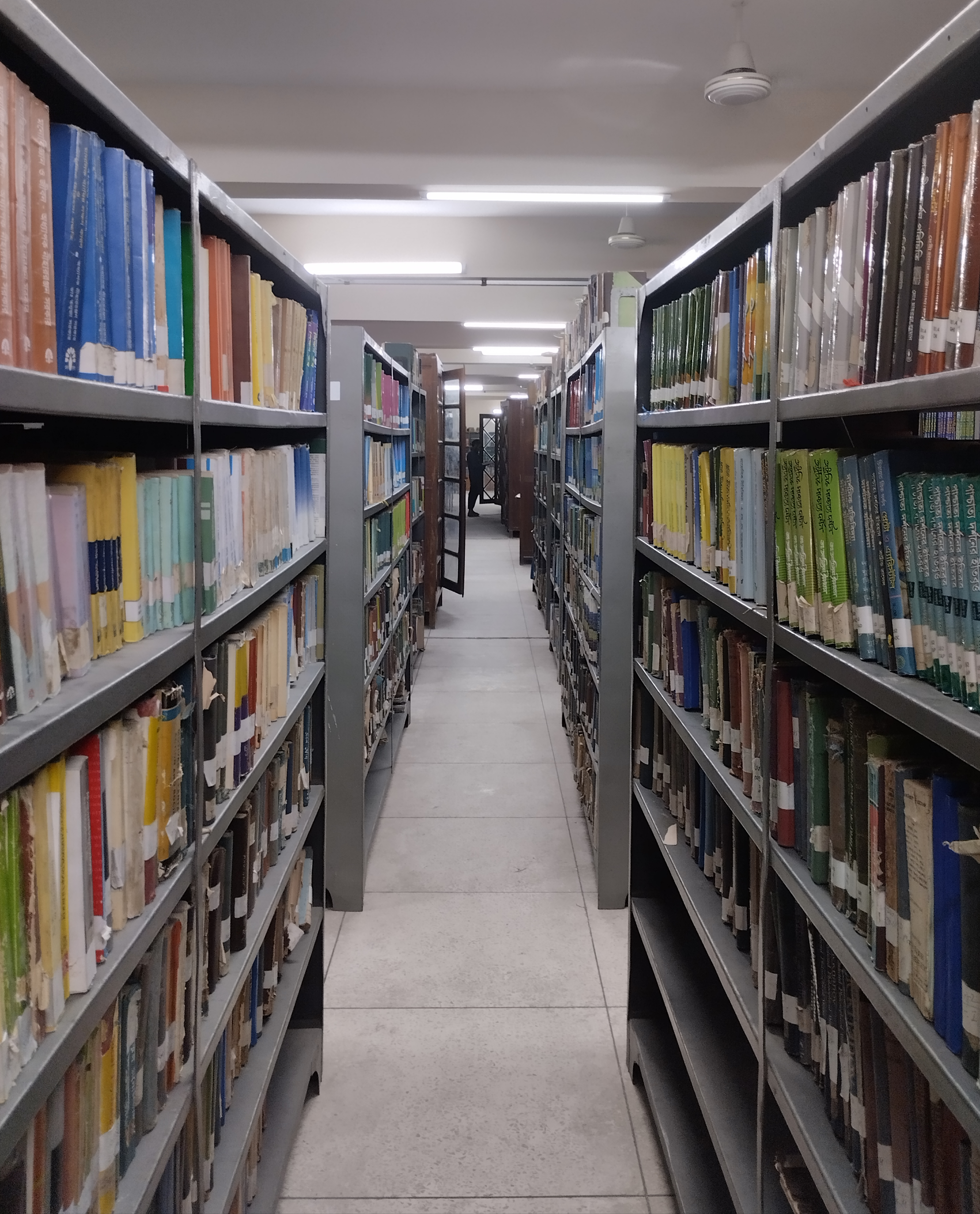
The interior view of Dhaka College Central Library

The library of Dhaka College was established in 1841, the same year the college was founded. With the increase in the number of students and the introduction of new programs, the development of physical infrastructure became essential. In 1876, Acting Principal A. Eubiasc mentioned in a letter to the government that the college needed new classrooms, a library, a hall room, a chemical laboratory, and a large room for physical sciences. In 1904, "Curzon Hall" was constructed with funding from the prince of Bhawal, which was used as a library. In 1908, Dhaka Law College was relocated to Curzon Hall. From 1908 to 1921, the library's collection grew to around 8,000 books.

In 2013–14, with the assistance of Dhaka College alumnus Md. Mozammel Haque Bhuiyan, a modern library named ‘Maruf-Sharmin Smriti Library’ was established. However, the library has not seen any development over time. Despite an increase in the number of students, the seating capacity and other facilities have not been expanded. The current college library houses 50,000 books, along with a well-furnished reading room. The library provides academic support to over 200 students every day. Dhaka College Central Library's librarian, Parimal Kumar Biswas, mentioned that students can study in the library from 8 AM to 4 PM, five days a week.

=== Other facilities ===
Laboratory
- Physics Lab
- Chemistry Lab
- Botany Lab
- Zoology Lab
- Computer Lab

Academic buildings

- Main Building
- Red Building/Botany Building
- ICT Building/Statistic Building
- New Examination Building/Library Building
Others
- Cafeteria
- Mosque
- Medical Center
- Gymnasium
- Central Playground
- Hall Playground
- Lawn Tennis Court
- Basketball Court
- Pond
- Flower garden
- Shaheed Minar
- Principal's residence
- Residential building for Teachers

== Gallery ==
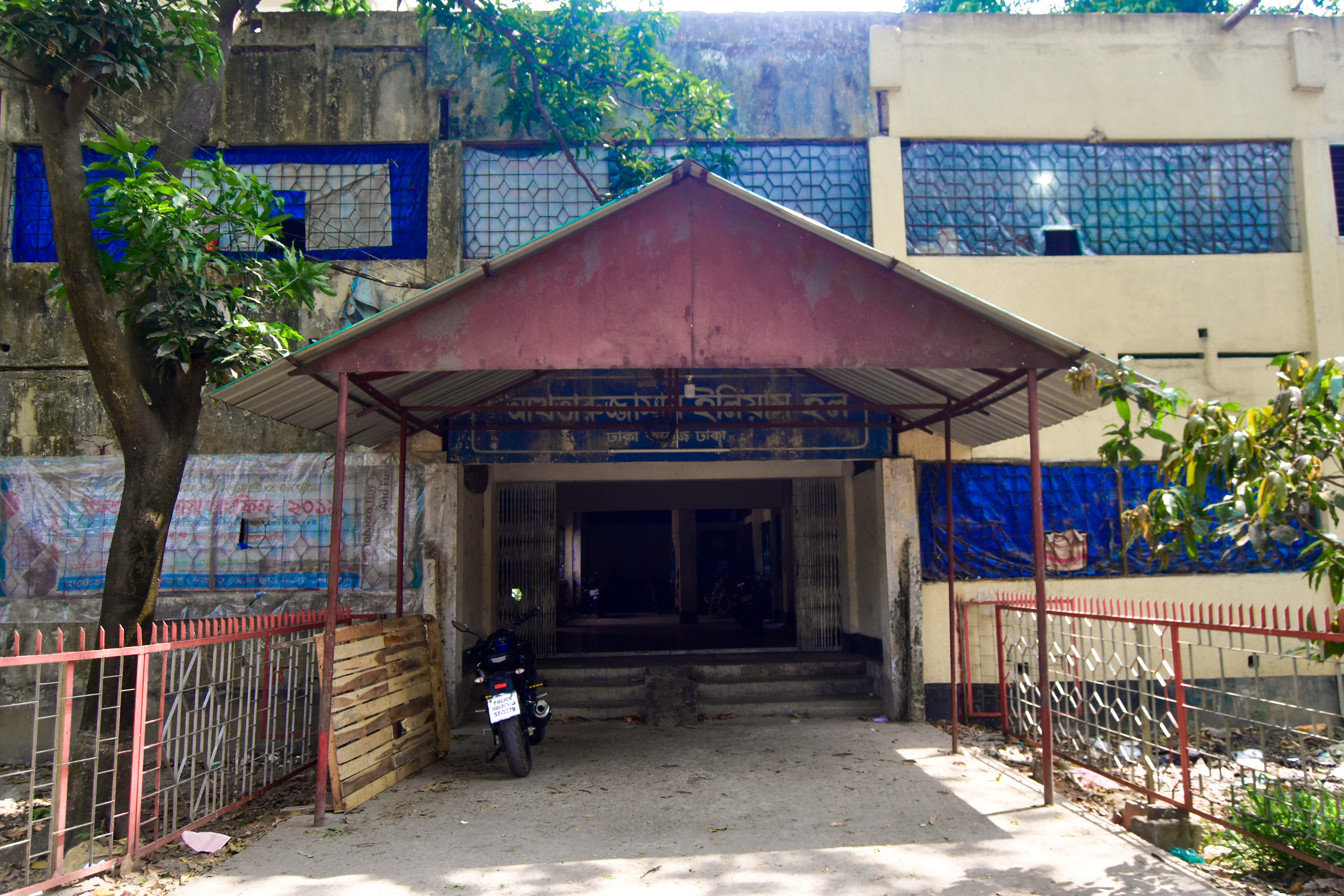
Akhtarujjaman Elias Hall, Dhaka College

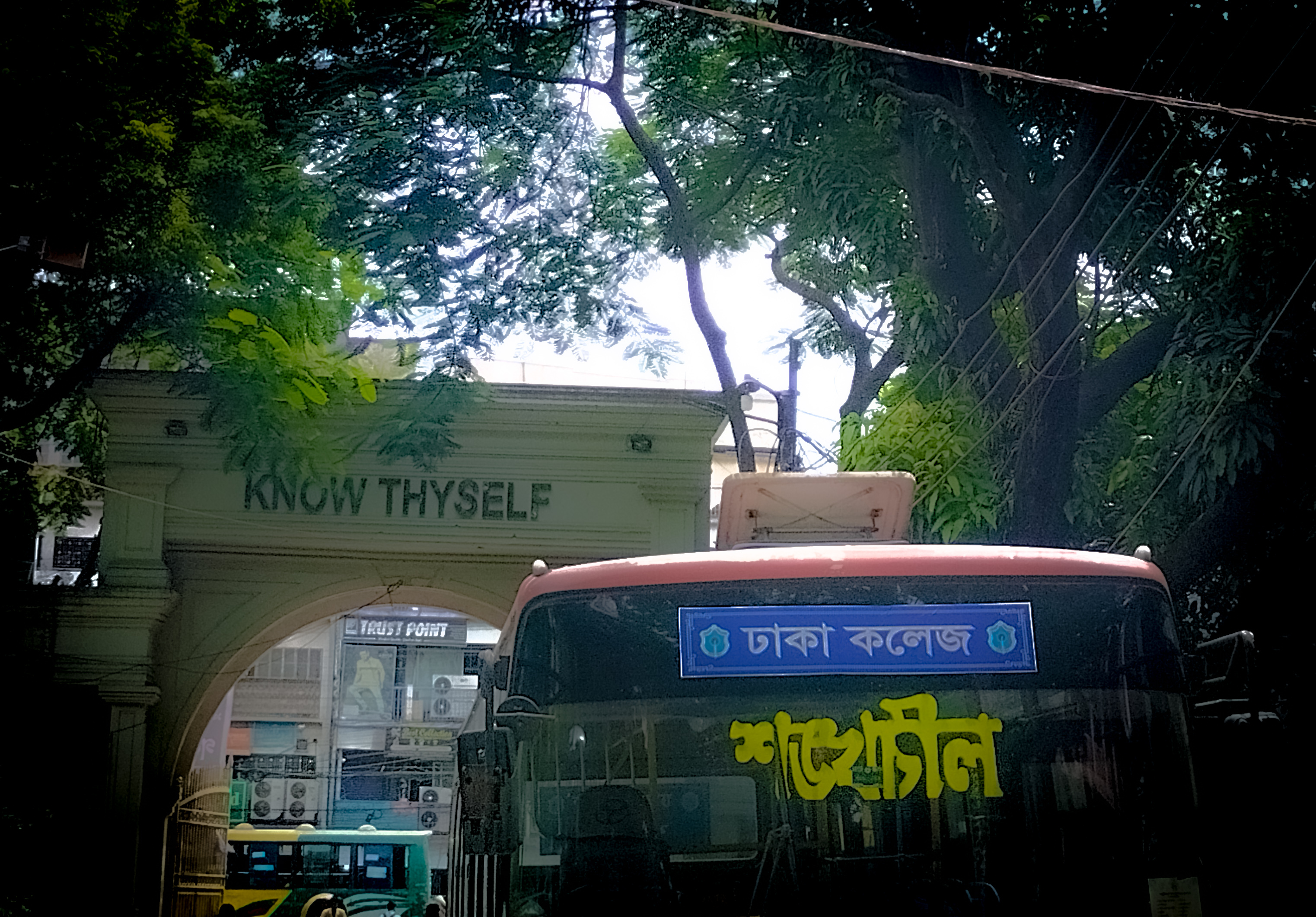
"Shongkhocil Bus" of Dhaka College

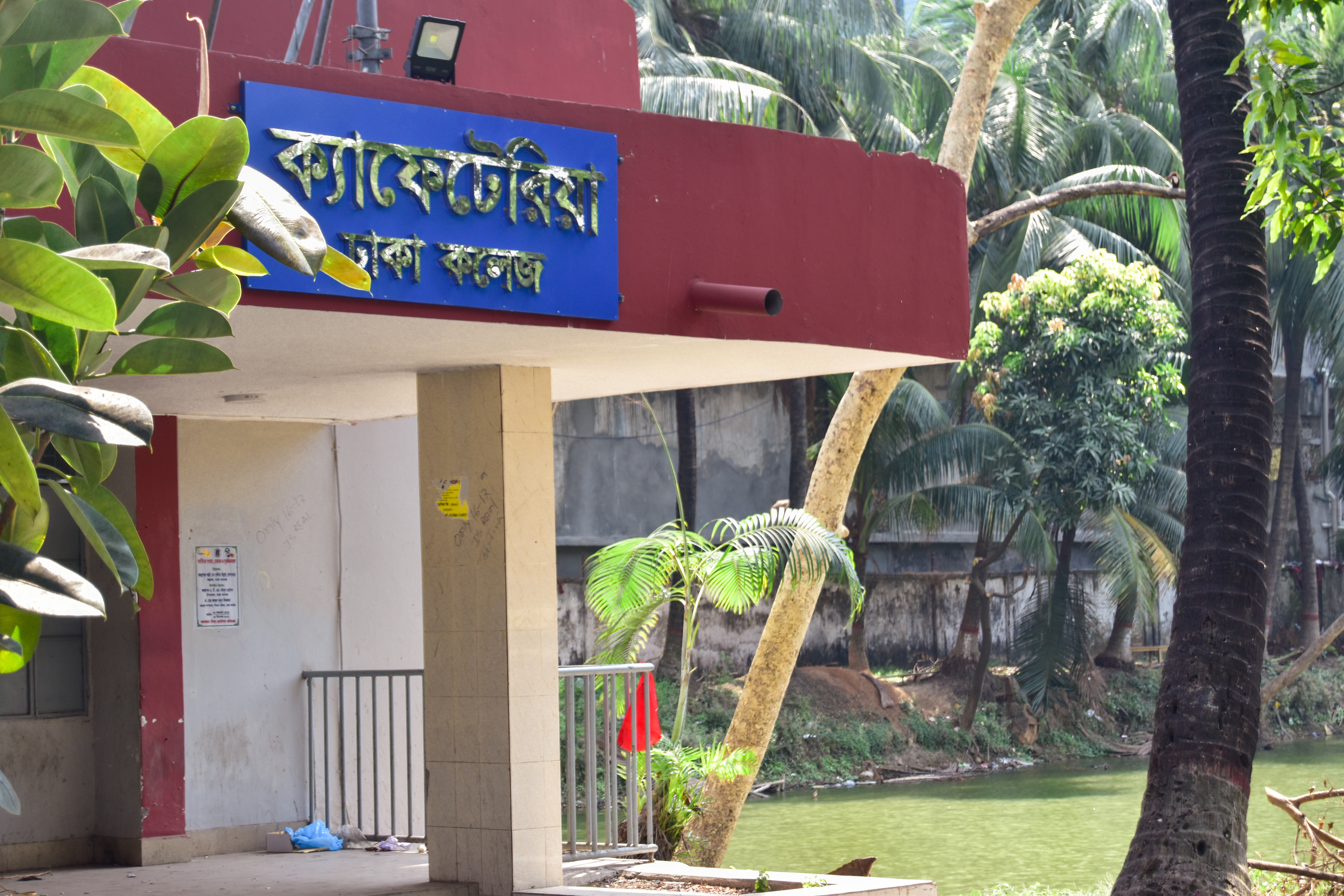
Cafeteria of Dhaka College

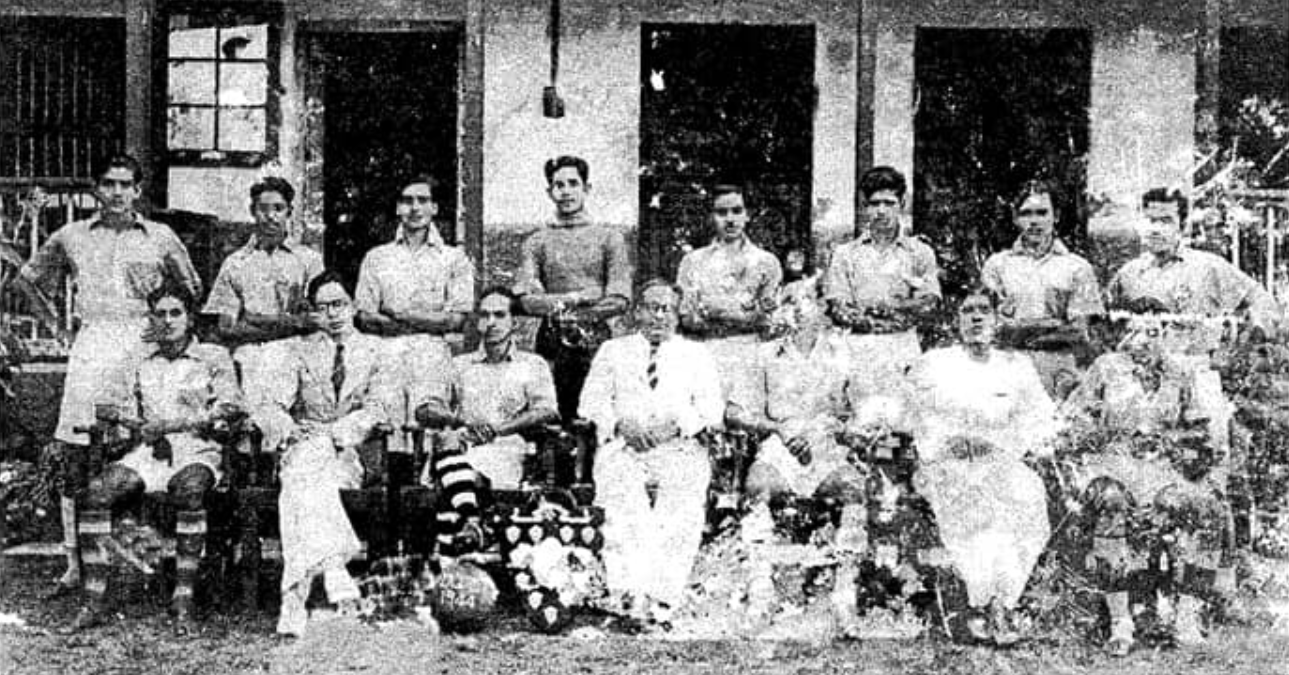
Football team of Dhaka College in 1946
