= New Market Thana =

Thana in Dhaka South City Corporation, Bangladesh

New Market Thana নিউ মার্কেট থানা
- Thana
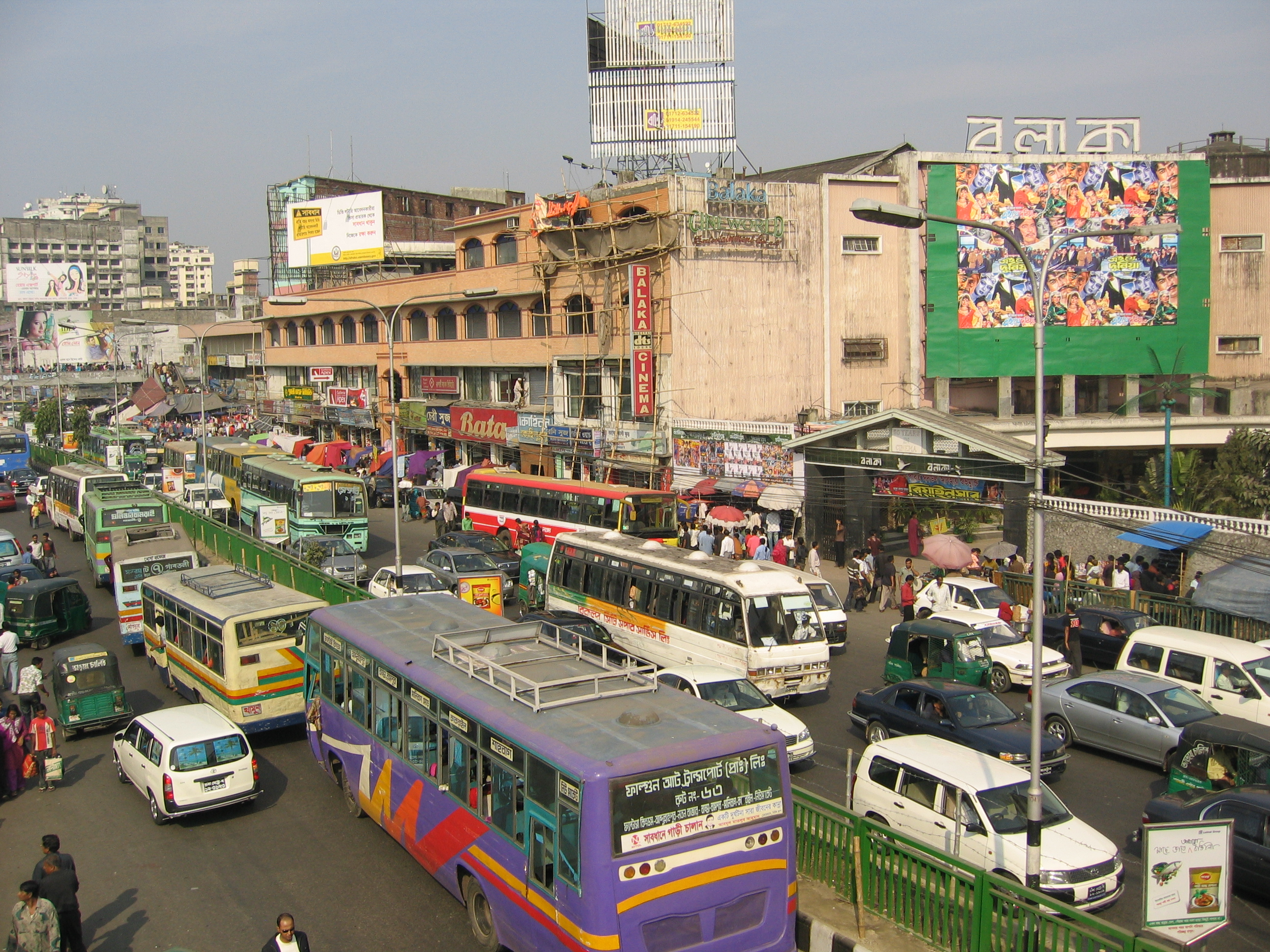
- Balaka cinema hall near Dhaka New Market

- Location of New Market Thana within Dhaka Location of New Market Thana within Bangladesh New Market Thana (Bangladesh)
- Coordinates: 23.73115°N 90.37993°E
- Country: Bangladesh
- Division: Dhaka Division
- District: Dhaka District
- Established as a thana: 2005

Area
  - Total: 1.67 km^{2} (0.64 sq mi)
- Elevation: 23 m (75 ft)

Population (2022)
  - Total: 54,210
  - Density: 29,654/km^{2} (76,800/sq mi)
- Time zone: UTC+6 (BST)
- Postal code: 1205
- Area code: 02

New Market is a Thana of Dhaka District in the Division of Dhaka, Bangladesh. New Market and Chandni Chowk are situated in this thana area. The Dhaka College is also located here.

== Demographics ==
Religions in Newmarket Thana (2022)
Religion	Percent
Islam	93.95%
Hinduism	5.62%
Other or not stated	0.44%

According to the 2022 Bangladeshi census, Newmarket Thana had 11,857 households and a population of 54,220. 5.72% of the population were under 5 years of age. Newmarket had a literacy rate (age 7 and over) of 94.91%: 95.88% for males and 93.61% for females, and a sex ratio of 133.12 males for every 100 females.

According to 2011 Census of Bangladesh, New Market Thana has a population of 49,523 with average household size of 6.3 members, and an average literacy rate of 86.7% vs national average of 51.8% literacy.

== See also ==
- New Market, Dhaka
