= Curzon Hall =

- কার্জন হল
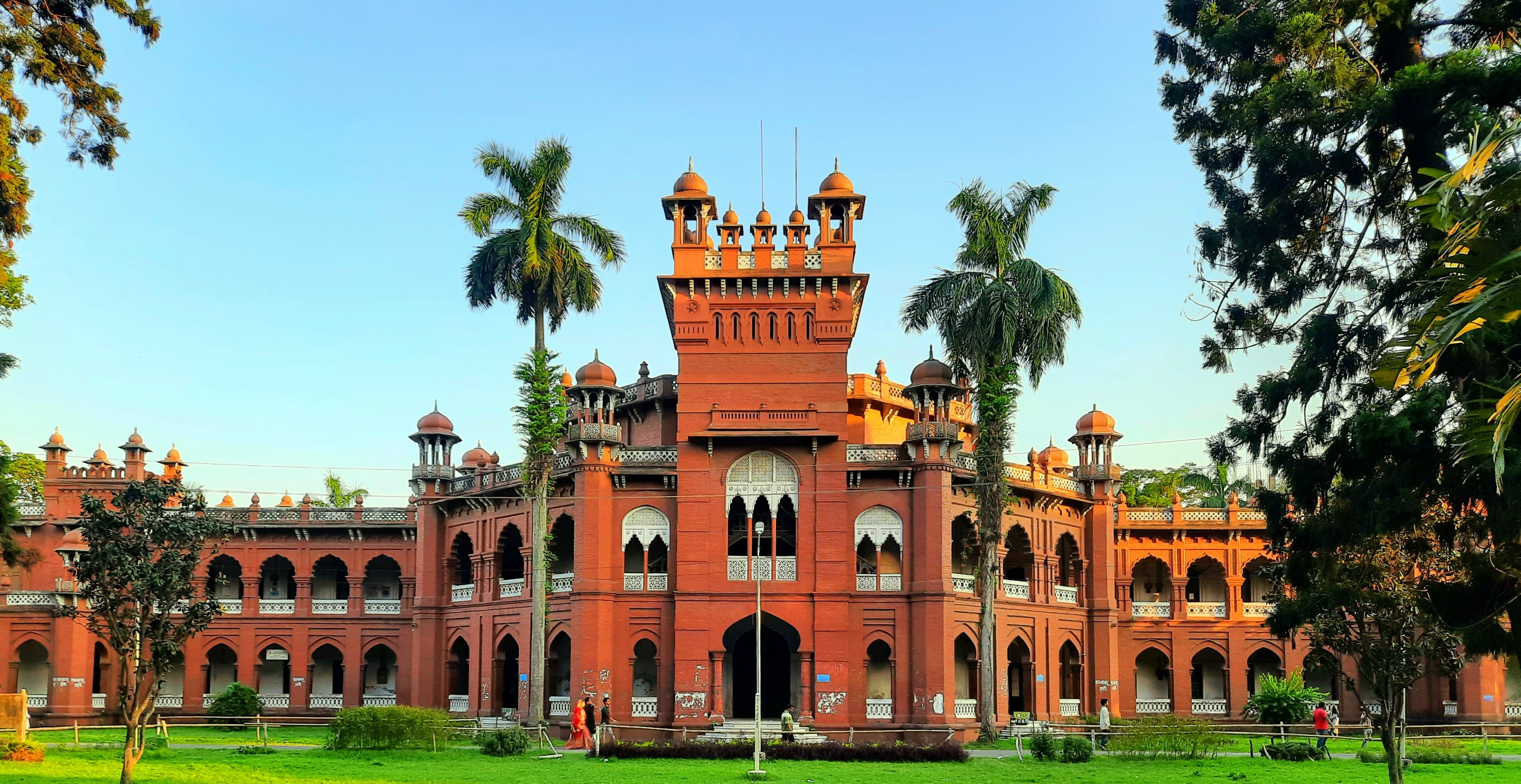
- Front view of Curzon Hall
- Interactive map of the Curzon Hall area

General information
- Status: In use
- Location: Shahbagh Thana, Dhaka, Bangladesh
- Coordinates: 23.727389°N 90.401902°E
- Groundbreaking: 19 February 1904
- Owner: University of Dhaka

Curzon Hall is a British Raj-era building and the home of the Faculty of Sciences at the University of Dhaka, located in Shahbagh.

The building was originally intended to be a town hall and is named after Lord Curzon, the Viceroy of India who laid its foundation stone in 1904. Upon the establishment of Dacca University in 1921, it became the base of the university's science faculty.

== History ==
In 1904 it was decided to shift Dhaka College to Nimatoli. Therefore, it is planned to construct this building as a college library near the proposed site for relocation. As a library, the building was named after the Governor General of British India, Lord Curzon, by the princes of Bhawal Estate who paid 0.15 million rupees. On 19 February that year, Lord Curzon came to Dhaka and laid its foundation stone. The following year, after the Partition of Bengal was finalized, a new province called Eastern Bengal and Assam was formed, with Dhaka as its capital. As a result, the importance of Curzon Hall increased at that time. The construction of Curzon Hall was completed in 1908. After the abolition of the Partition of Bengal in 1911, Dhaka College classes started in Curzon Hall. After the establishment of the University of Dhaka in 1921, Curzon Hall was transferred to the university and it included in the science department of the university. During the Bengali language movement, 1948–1956, Curzon Hall was the location of various significant events. After the Partition of India in 1947 that formed the country of Pakistan, Urdu was chosen to be the sole state language. In 1948, the Constituent Assembly of Pakistan chose Urdu and English as the only languages to be used to address the assembly, which was protested within the assembly on the grounds that the majority of the people spoke Bangla and not Urdu. Students of the university objected instantly to the actions of the Constituent Assembly, and it was in Curzon Hall that they declared their opposition to the state language policy.

== Facilities ==
The Botanical Garden of the university is located on the premises of Curzon Hall, and is used by students and faculty for teaching botany and for scientific studies with plants.

== Gallery ==
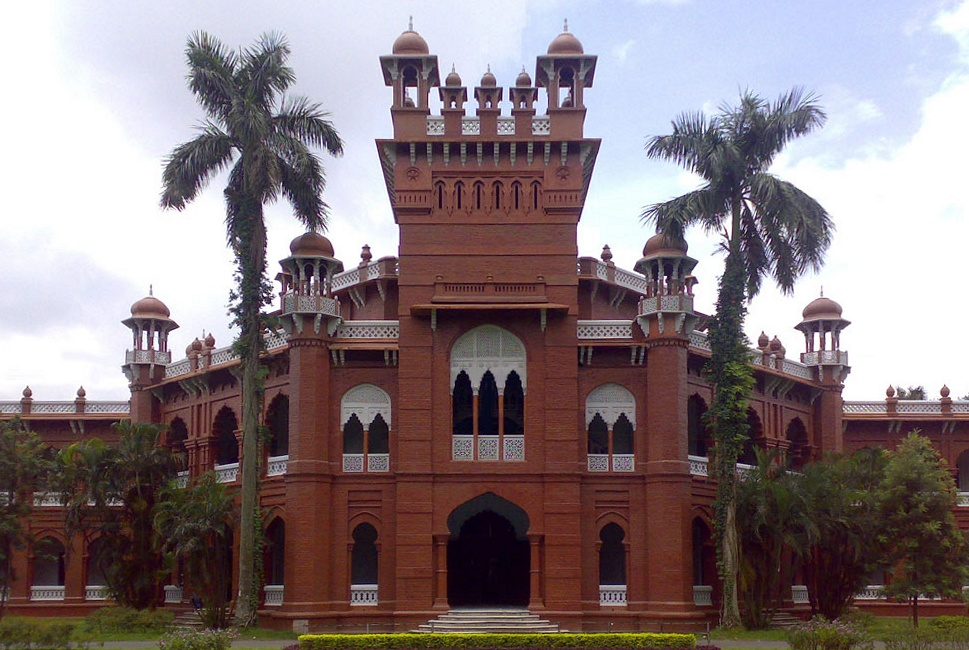

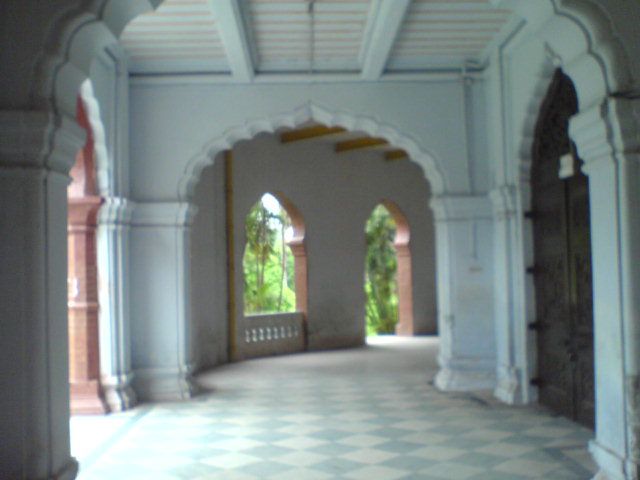

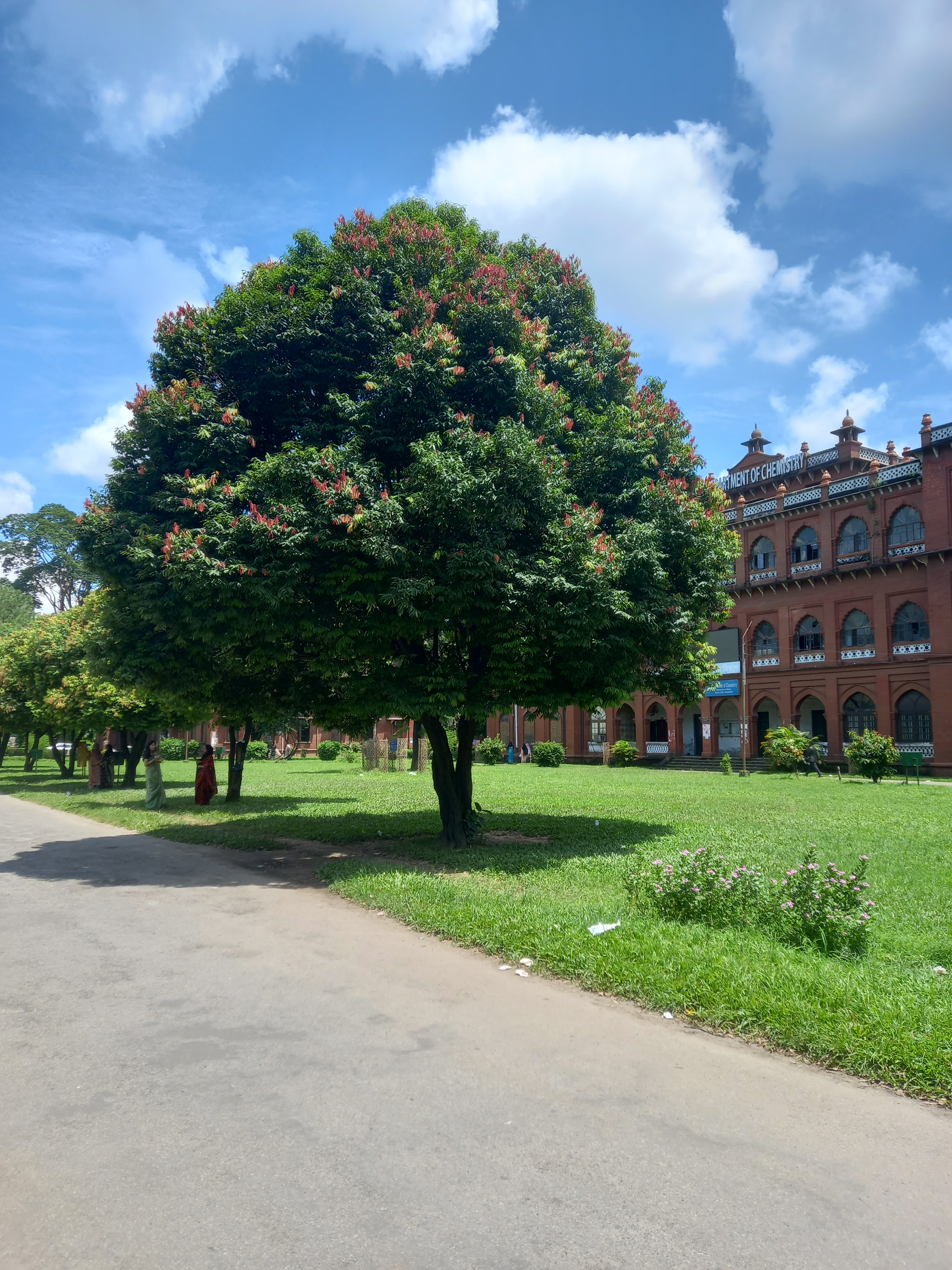

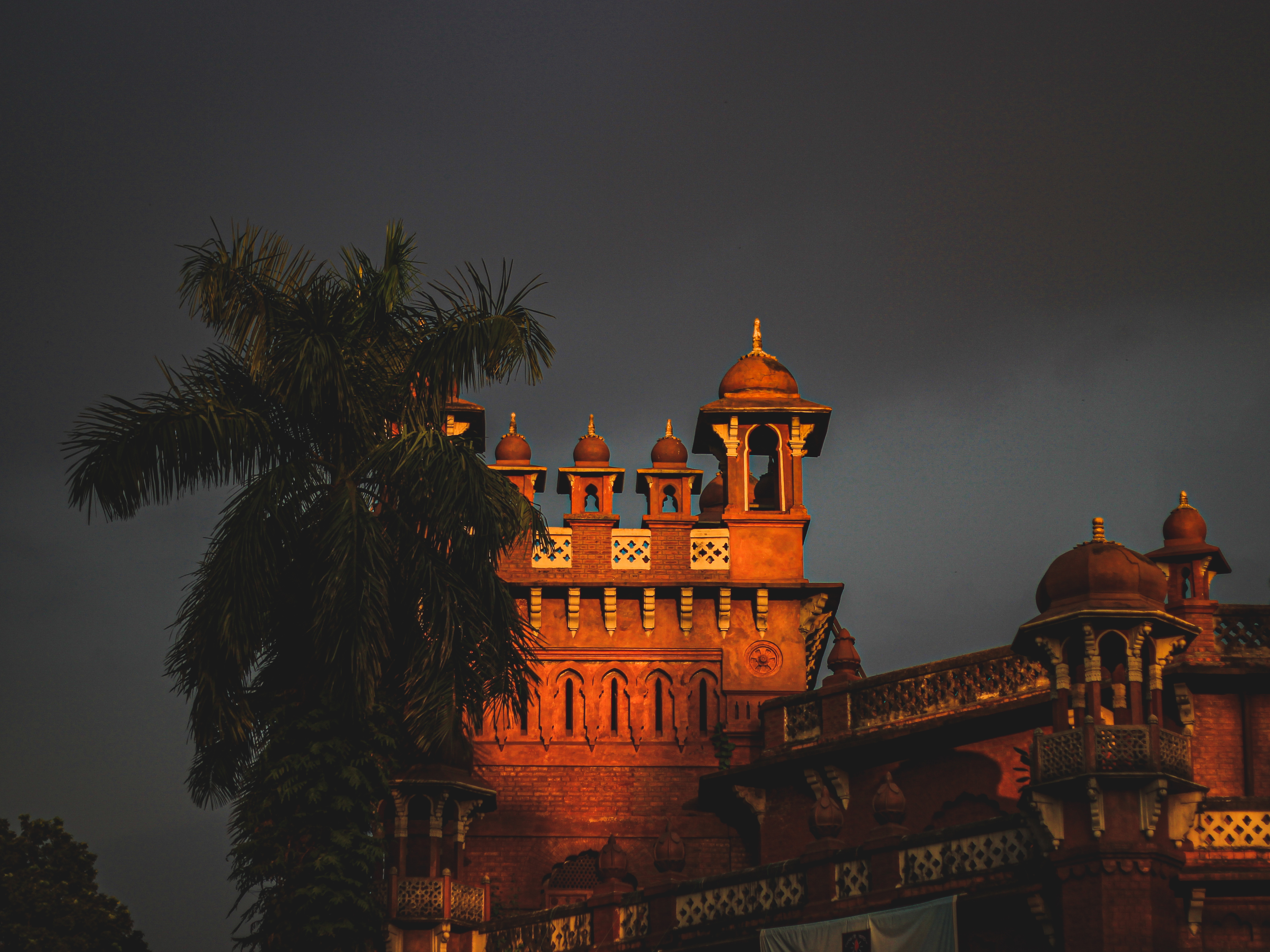

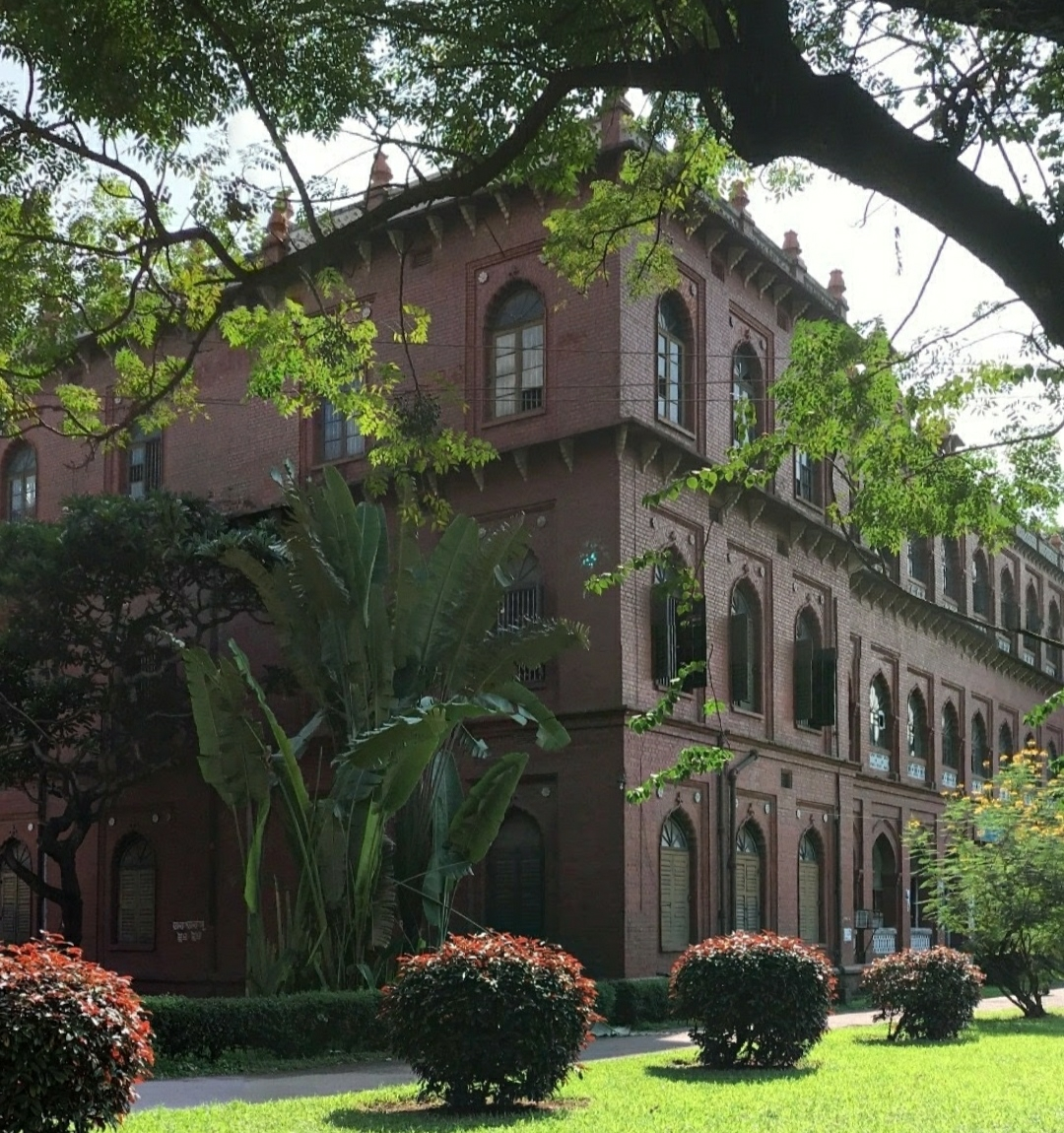

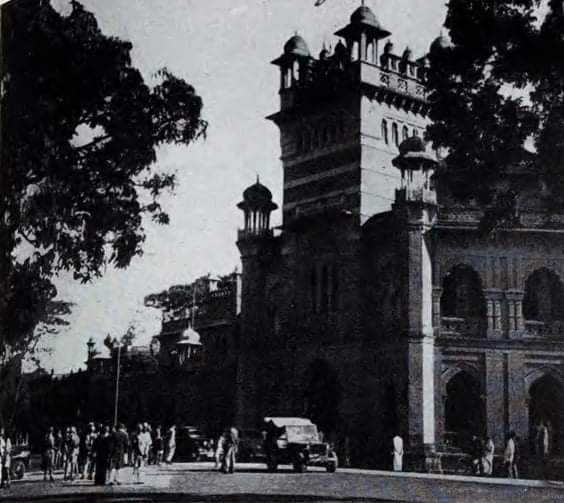

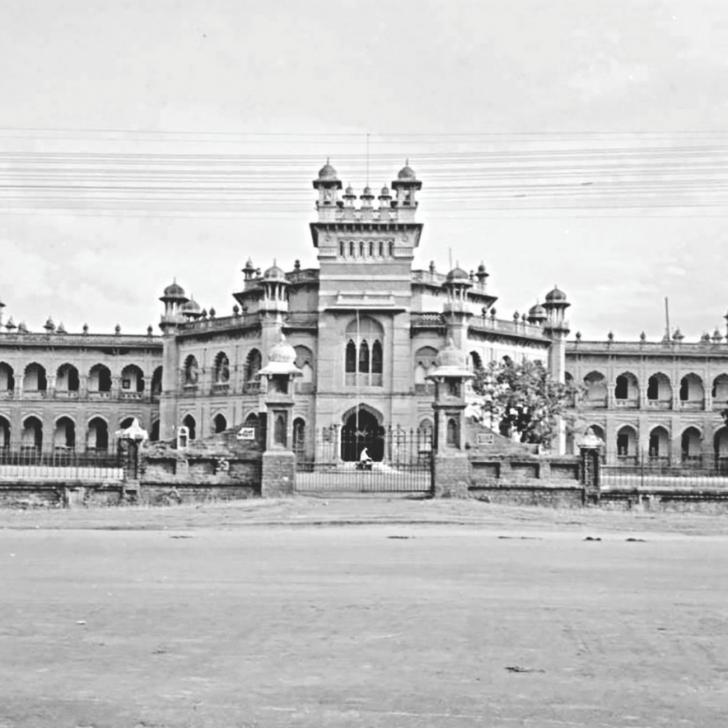

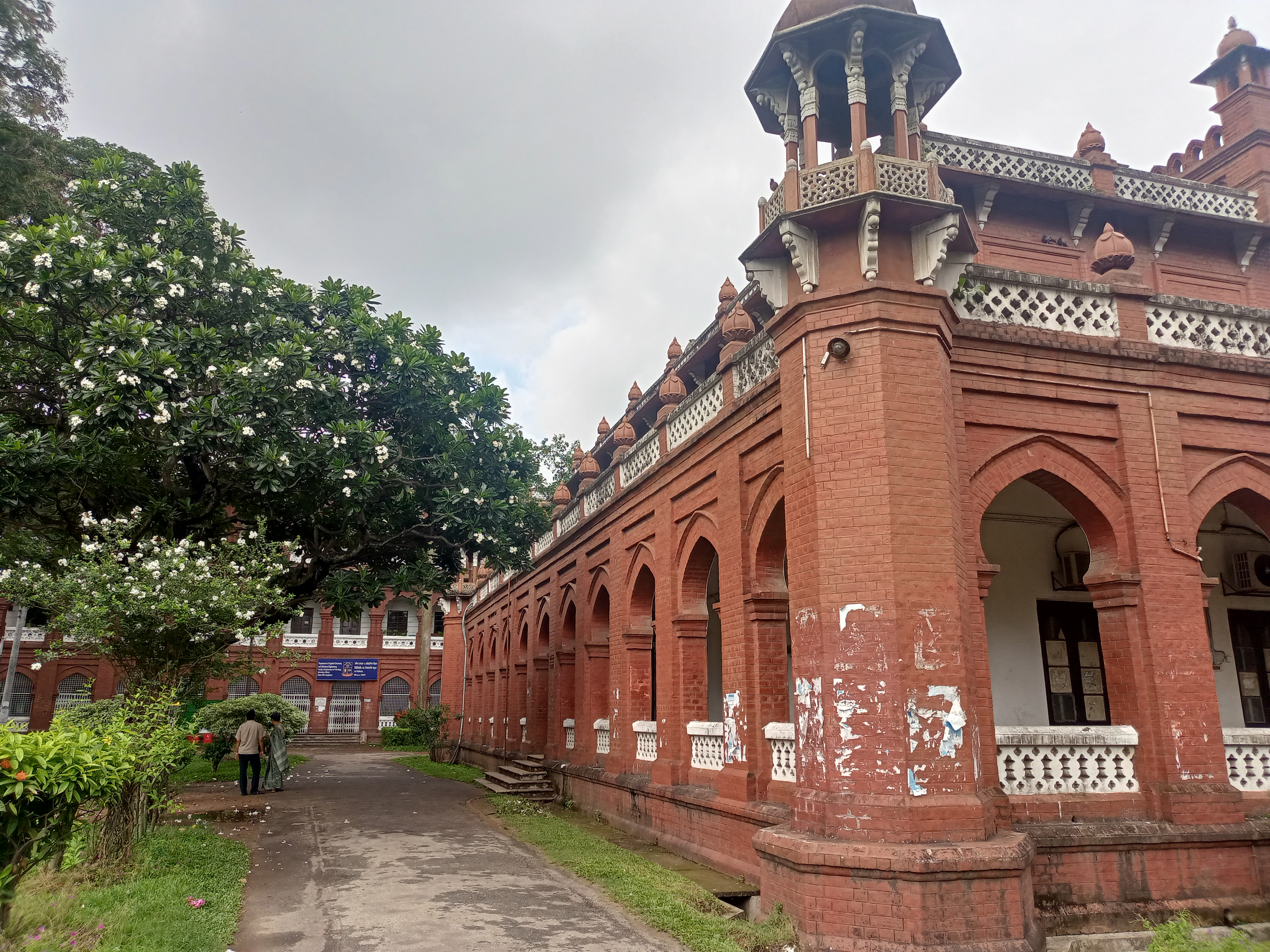

== See also ==
- Dr. Muhammad Shahidullah Hall
