= Muhammad Shahidullah (disambiguation) =

Muhammad Shahidullah was a Bengali linguist, philologist, educationist, and writer.

Muhammad Shahidullah may also refer to:

- Mohammad Shahidullah (Gazipur politician) (fl. 1986–1988), Bangladeshi politician
- Mohammad Shahidullah (Dhaka politician) (fl. 1979–1982), Bangladeshi politician
- Mohammed Shahidullah (general) (1963/1964–2020), Bangladesh Army general
