= Chandni Chowk, Dhaka =

Market in Dhaka, Bangladesh

Coordinates: 23.7340593°N 90.3848641°E

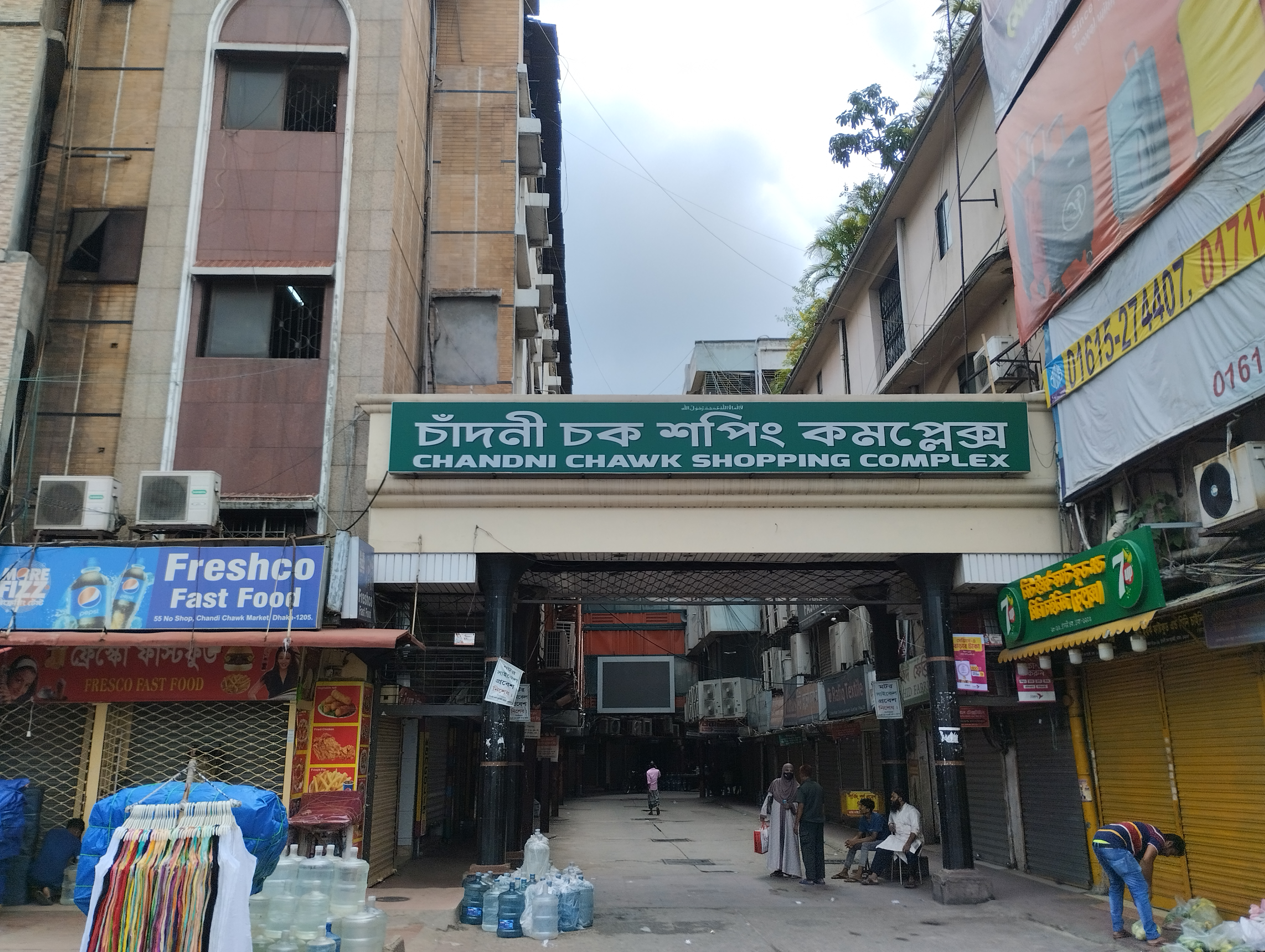
Entrance of the historical Chandni Chawk Shopping Complex

Chandni Chowk (Bengali: চাঁদনি চক) or Chandni Chowk Shopping Complex is a market in Dhaka, Bangladesh. It is situated on Mirpur Road, near New Market. This market area is under New Market Thana. The market is closed on Tuesdays. According to the Bangladesh Fire Service & Civil Defence, it is vulnerable to fire and a risky structure.

The market, which has 1,200 shops, sells a variety of products including clothes, jewellery and shoes. It is popular for buying and selling products on the occasion of Eid.

The incident of Eve teasing in the market on March 24, 2018, was criticized in the country. On October 21, 2020, a building at Chandni Chowk caught fire.
