= New Market, Dhaka =

Shopping mall in Dhaka, Bangladesh

Coordinates: 23.7333°N 90.3839°E

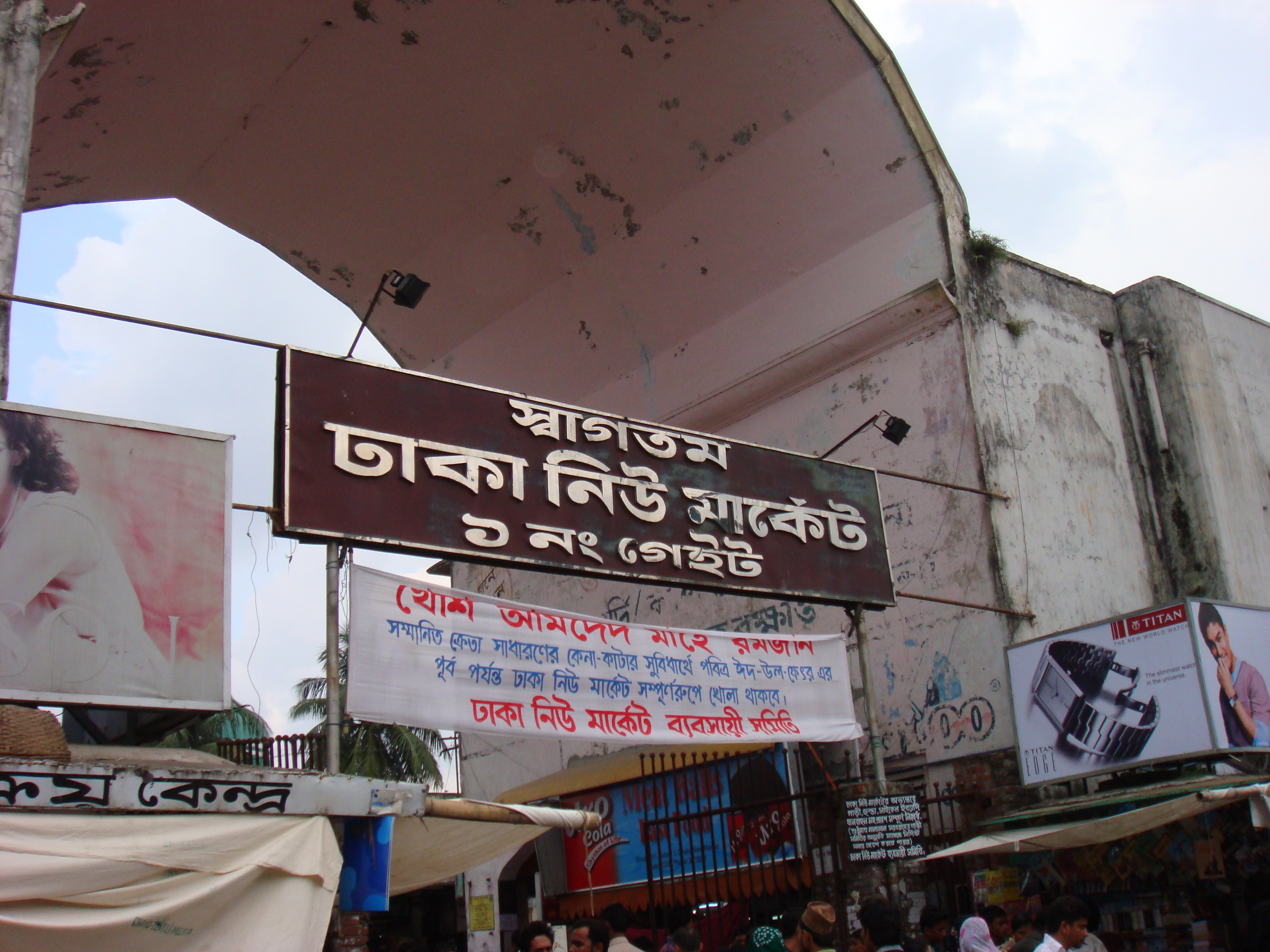
Dhaka New Market Copy, Gate 1

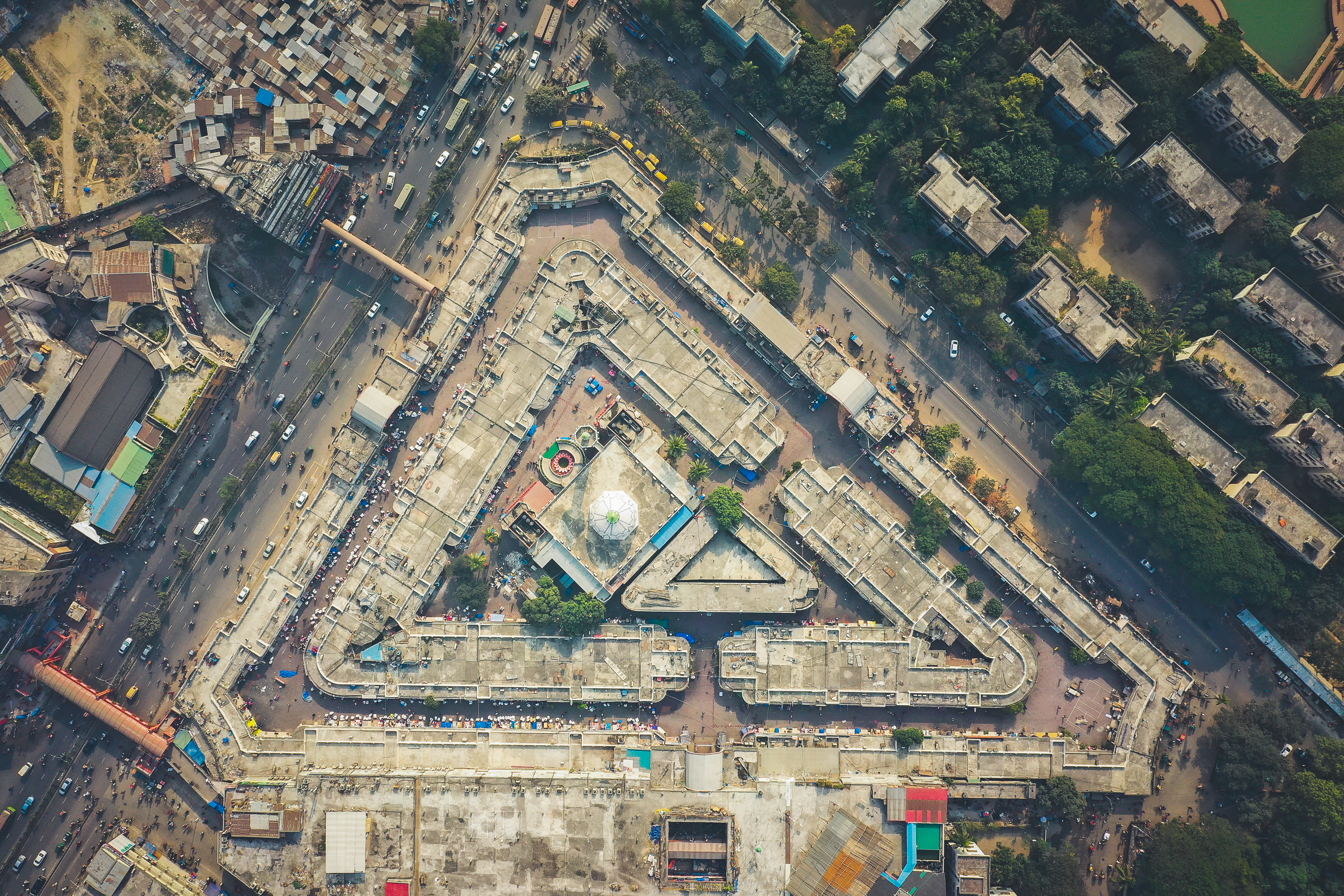
Interior view of Dhaka New Market

New Market (Bengali: নিউ মার্কেট) is the largest commercial shopping market in Bangladesh in north of Azimpur, Dhaka. It is situated on the opposite side of Chandni Chowk.

== History ==
The market was set up 1954 as a shopping complex, to cater to the needs of the people from the residential areas of University of Dhaka, Azimpur, Ramna and Dhanmondi.

Construction began in 1952, on 35 acres of land during the tenure of Nurul Amin as the Chief Minister of East Bengal. Construction ended in 1954.

Today the market has multiple buildings as well as sidewalk vendors.

== Architecture ==
New Market Copy area is triangular in shape with high arched entry gates on three sides. There were spaces for 440 shops and a triangular lawn at the center. The total area was 35 acres (140,000 m^{2}) of land.

== Legacy ==
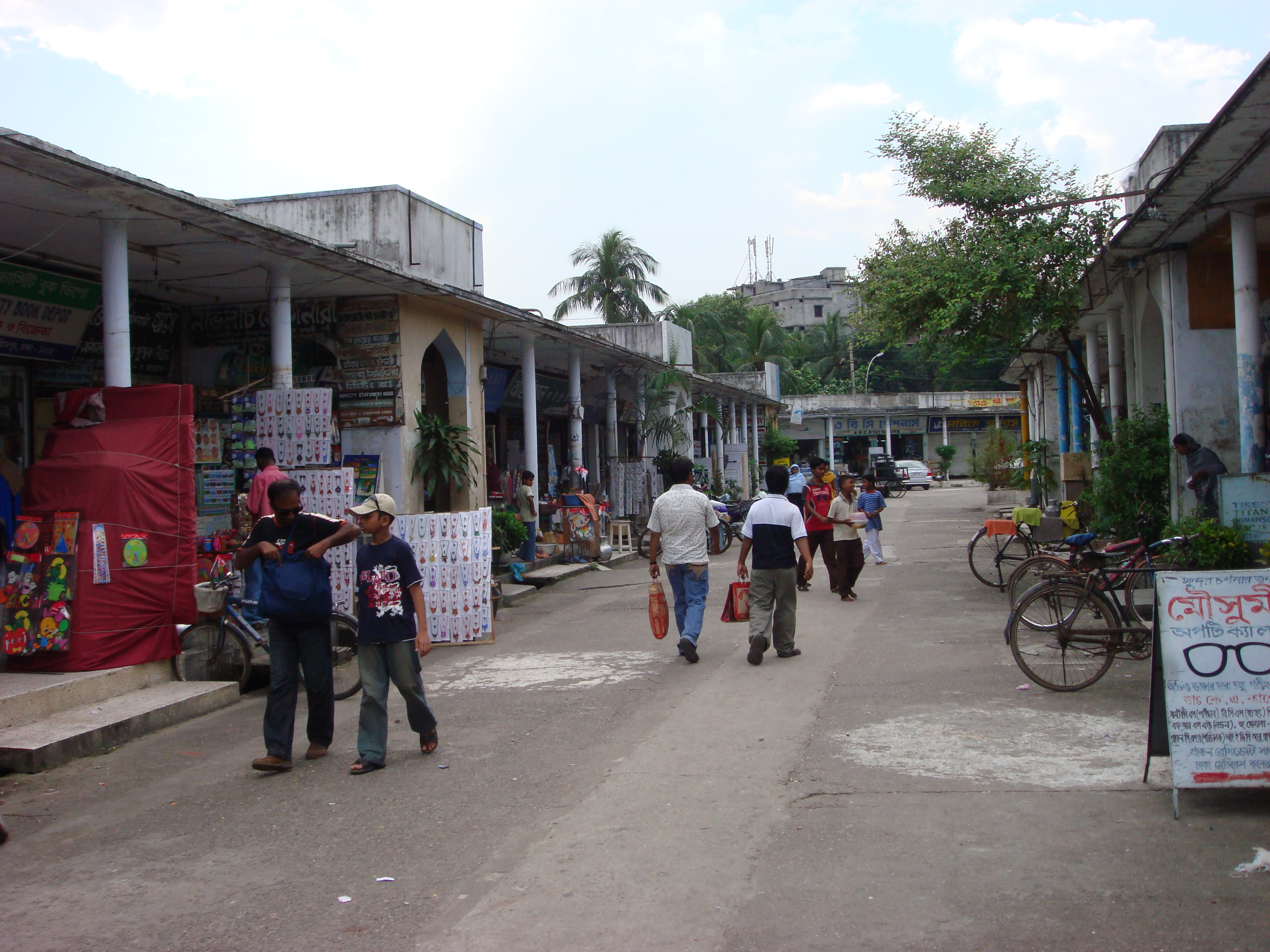
Inside Dhaka New Market

During the 1950s to early 1990s, it was the most popular place for shopping as well as recreation. Novelty, an ice-cream shop, was one of the most popular destinations of the young people. During the 1980s, 3 more New Market blocks were constructed on the north under Dhaka City Corporation, for example, New Super Market for crockeries, Bonolata for kitchen market, Chandrima and Gausia market for varieties of items and D block for groceries, each having over thousand shops. A park inside has been converted into a mosque at first floor level with sixty new shops under it.

== Gallery ==
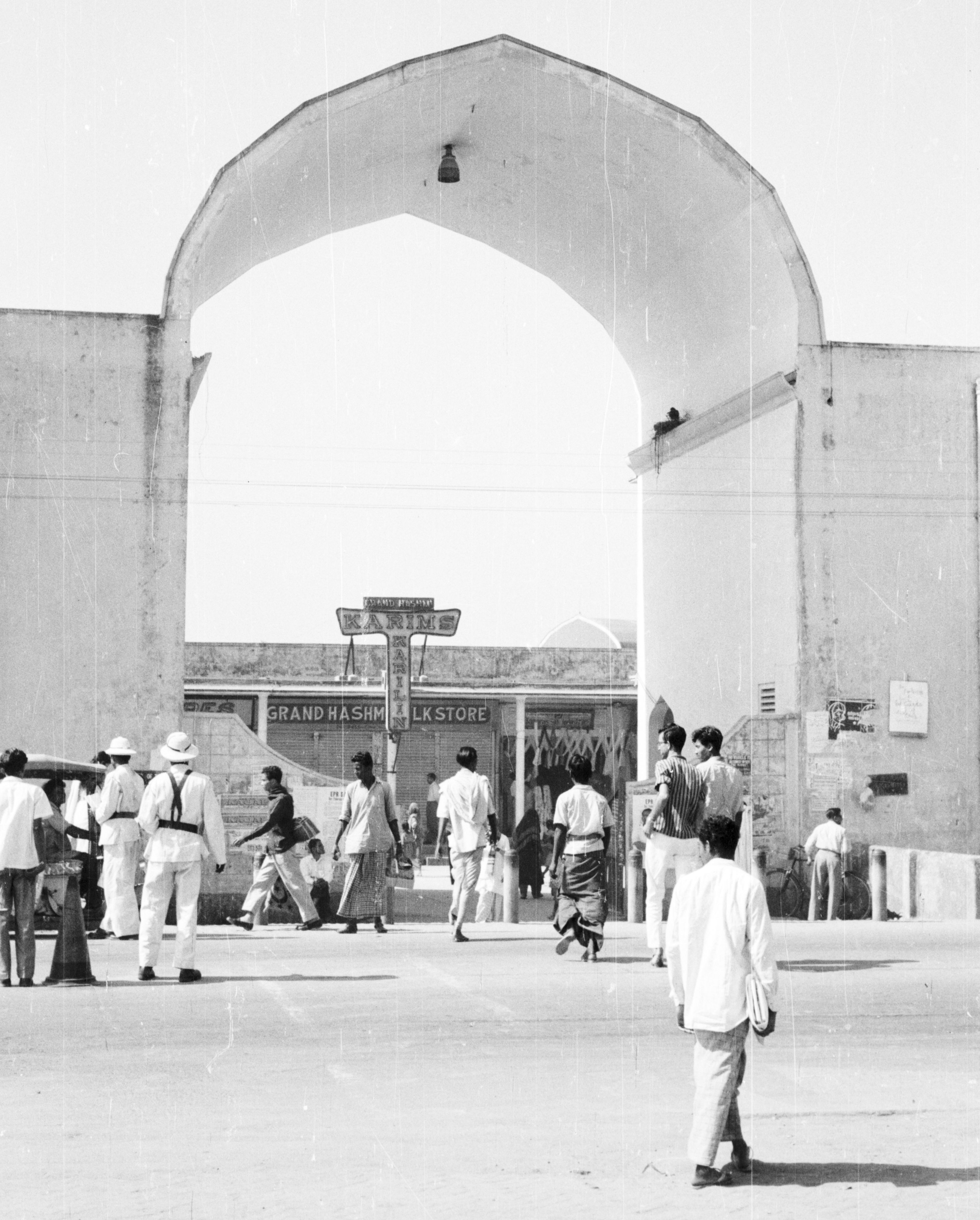
Main gateway from outside (1966)

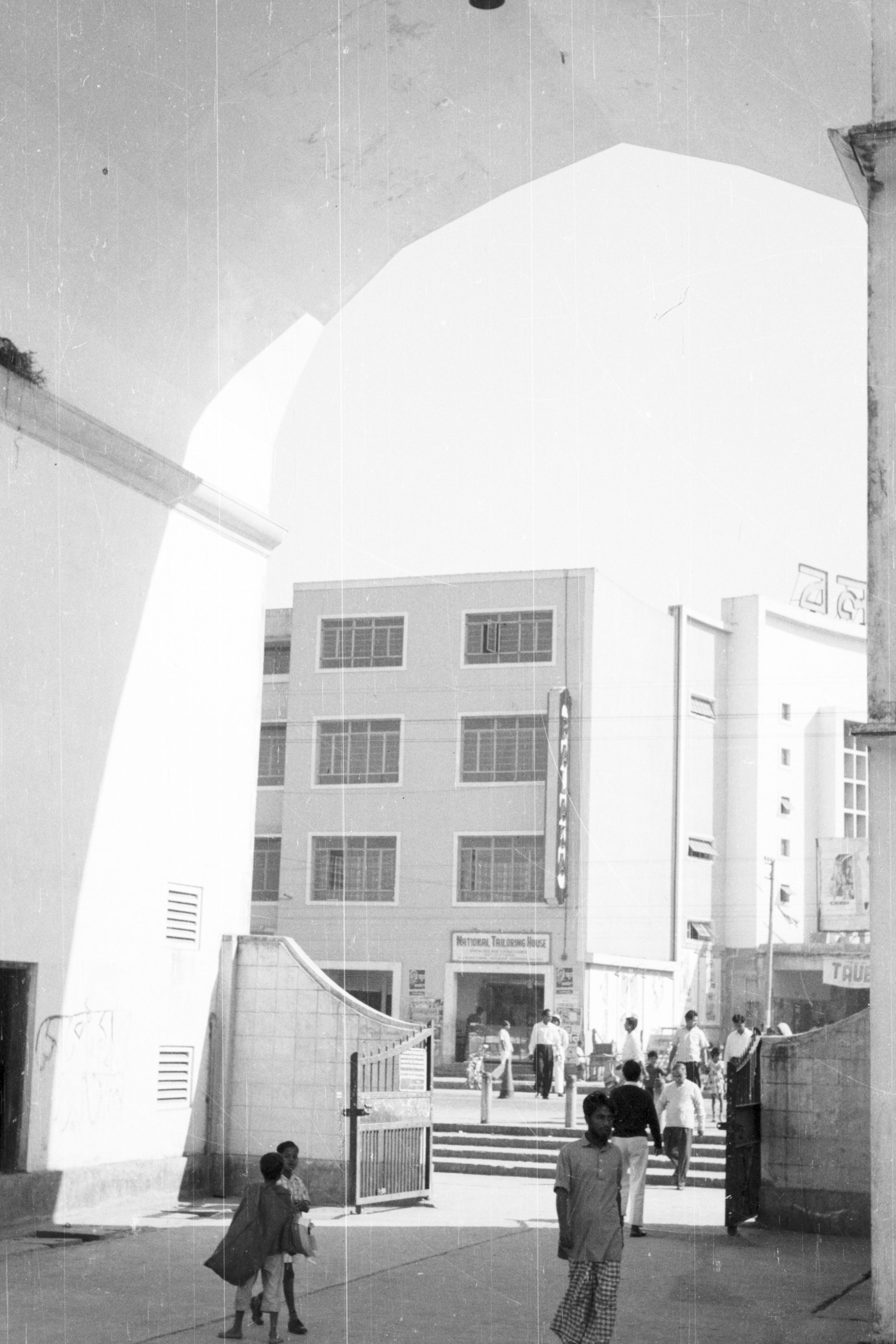
Main gateway from inside (1966)

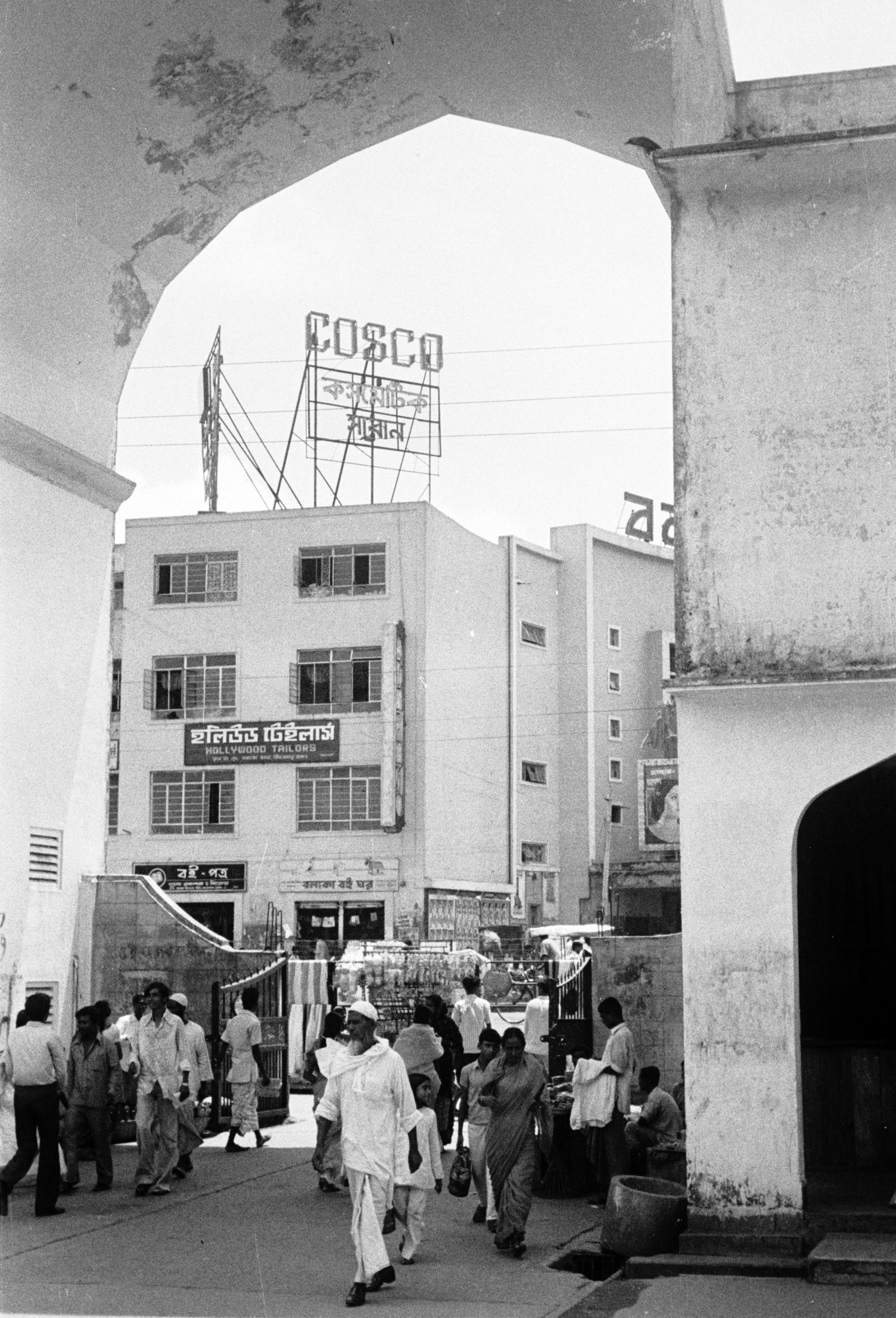
Main gateway from inside (1974)

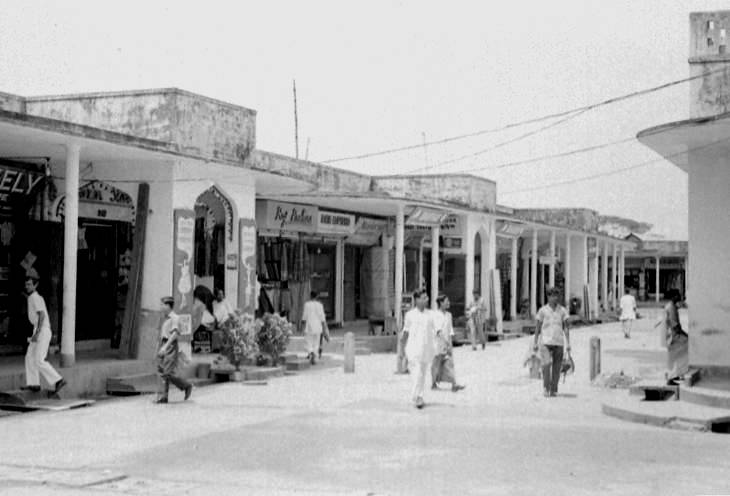
Shops in the outer arcade (1966)

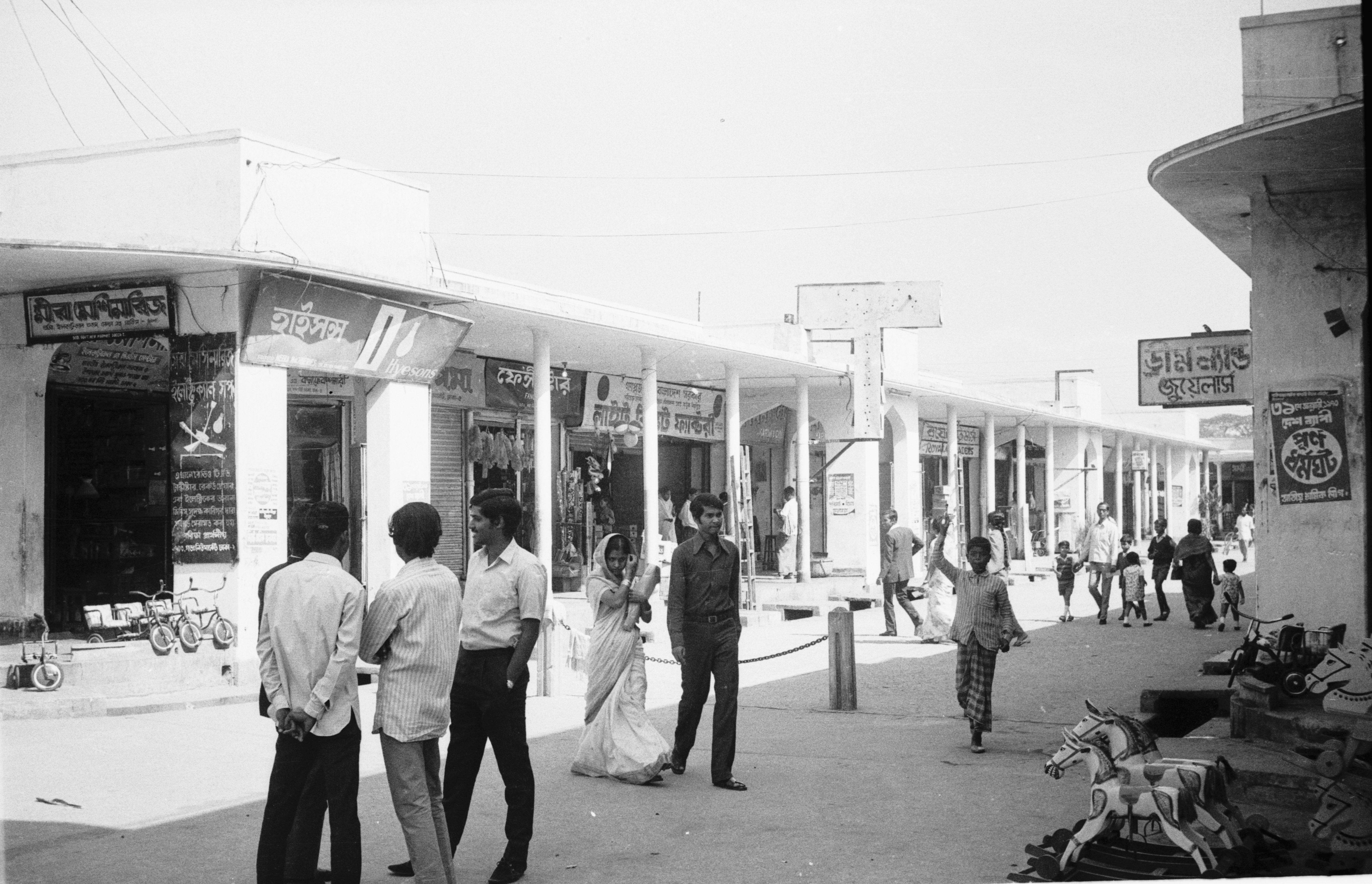
Shops in the outer arcade (1974)

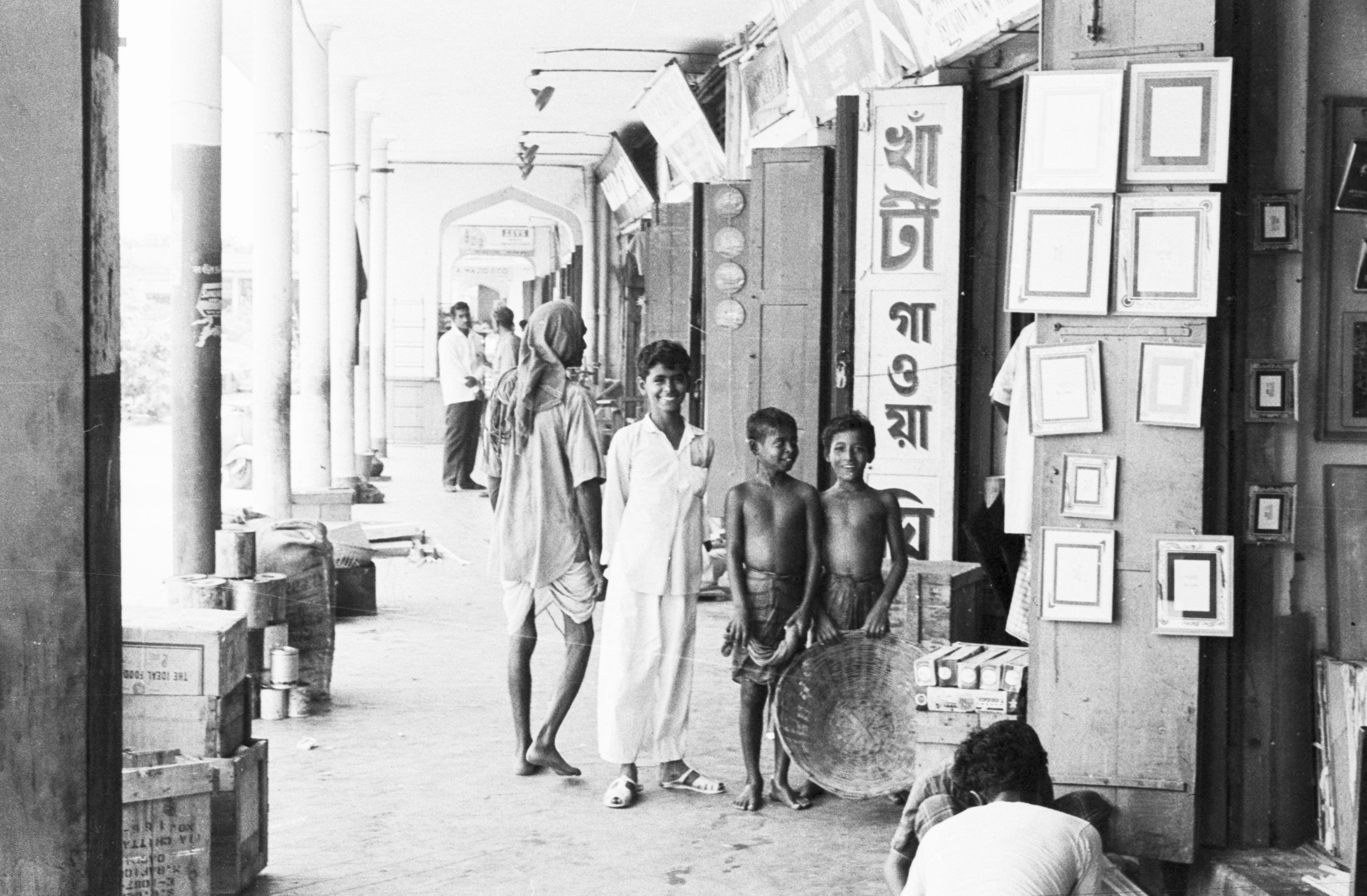
Shops in the inner arcade (1966)

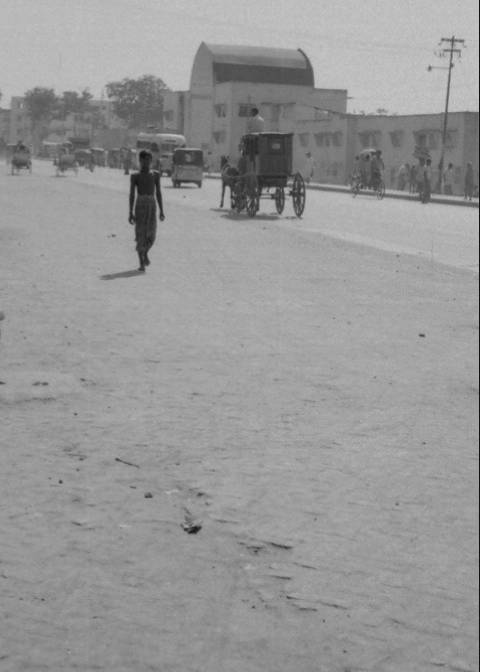
Mirpur Road outside New Market (1966)

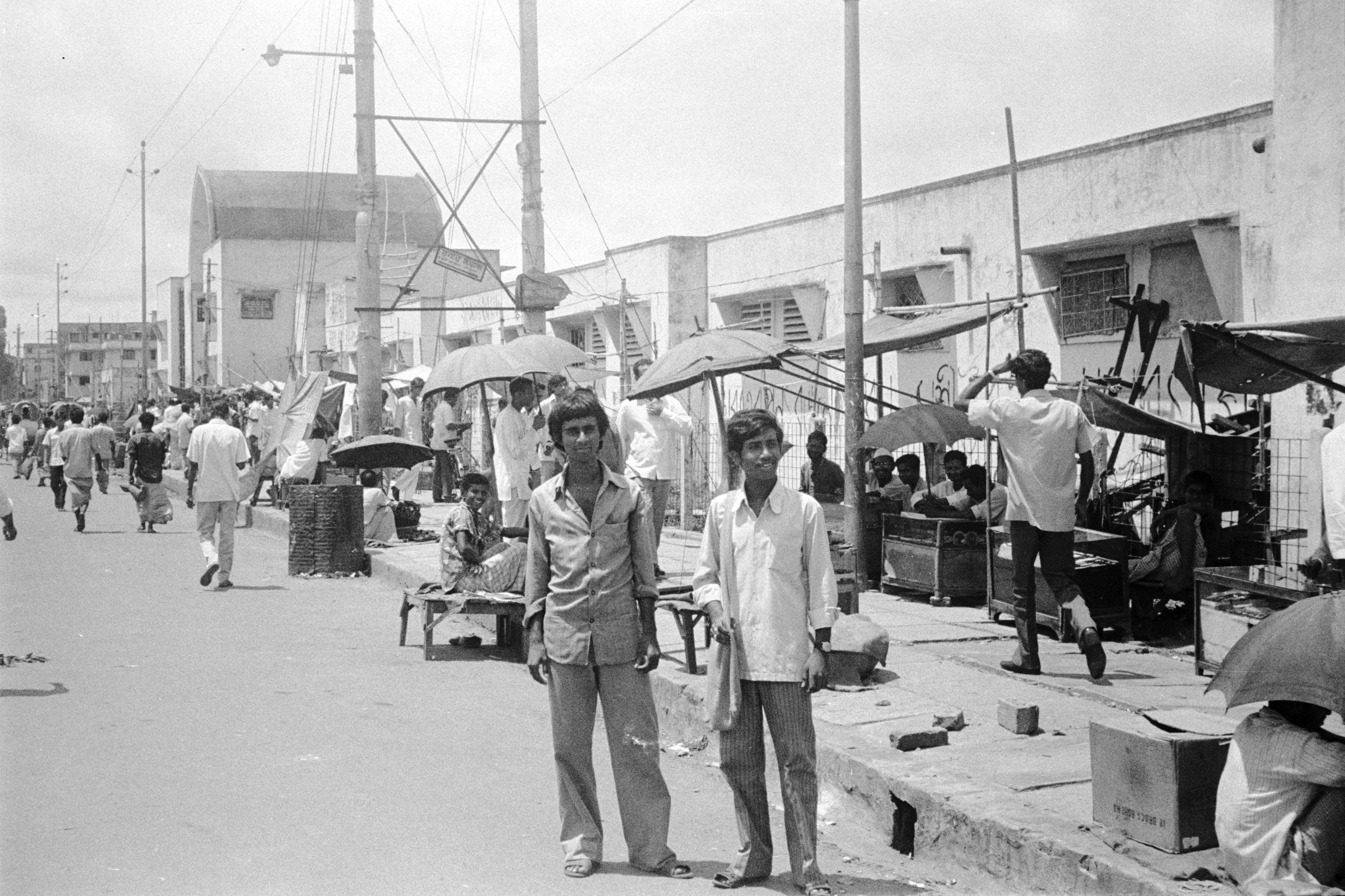
East front of New Market (1974)

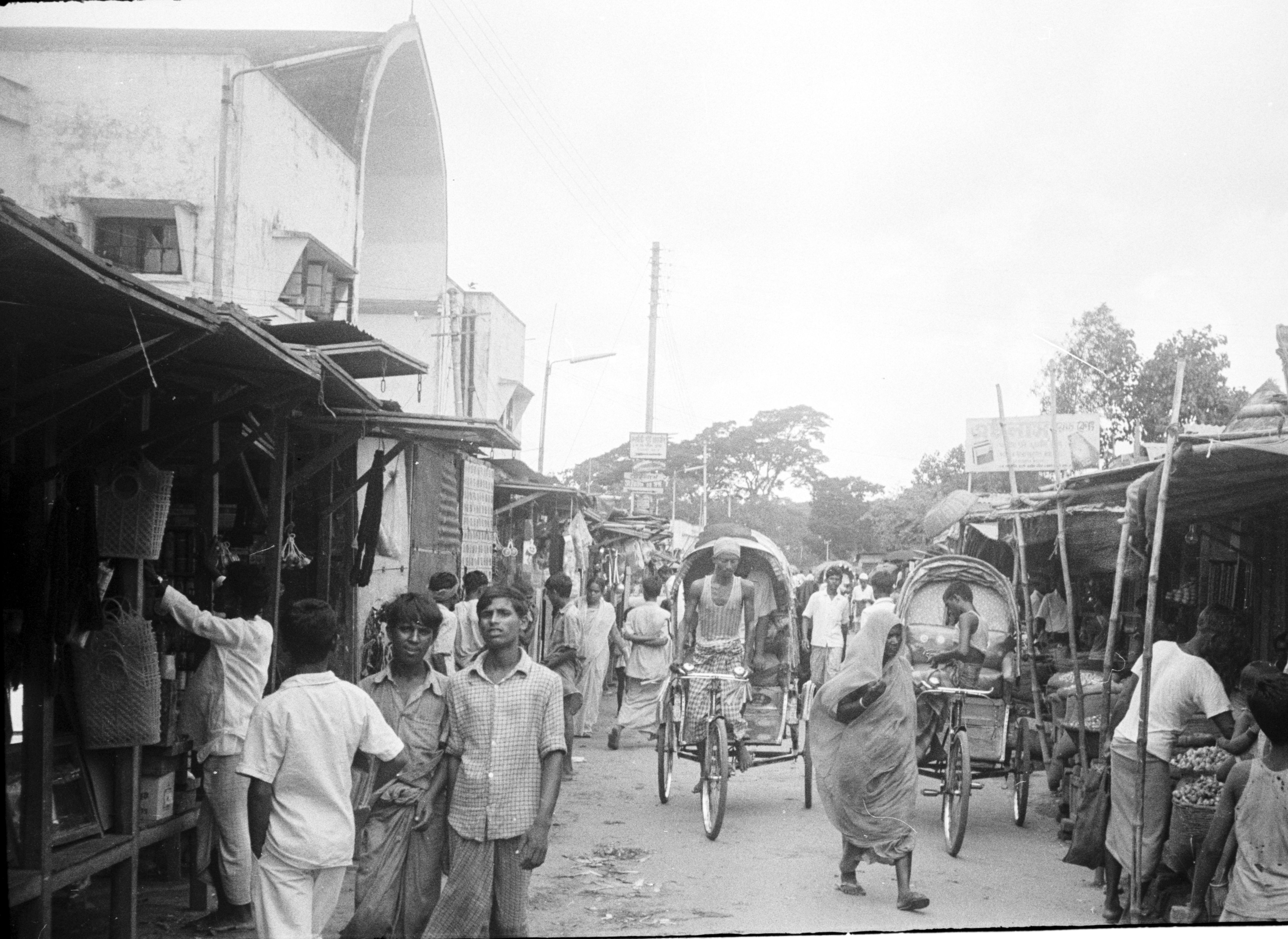
North side of the market (1974)

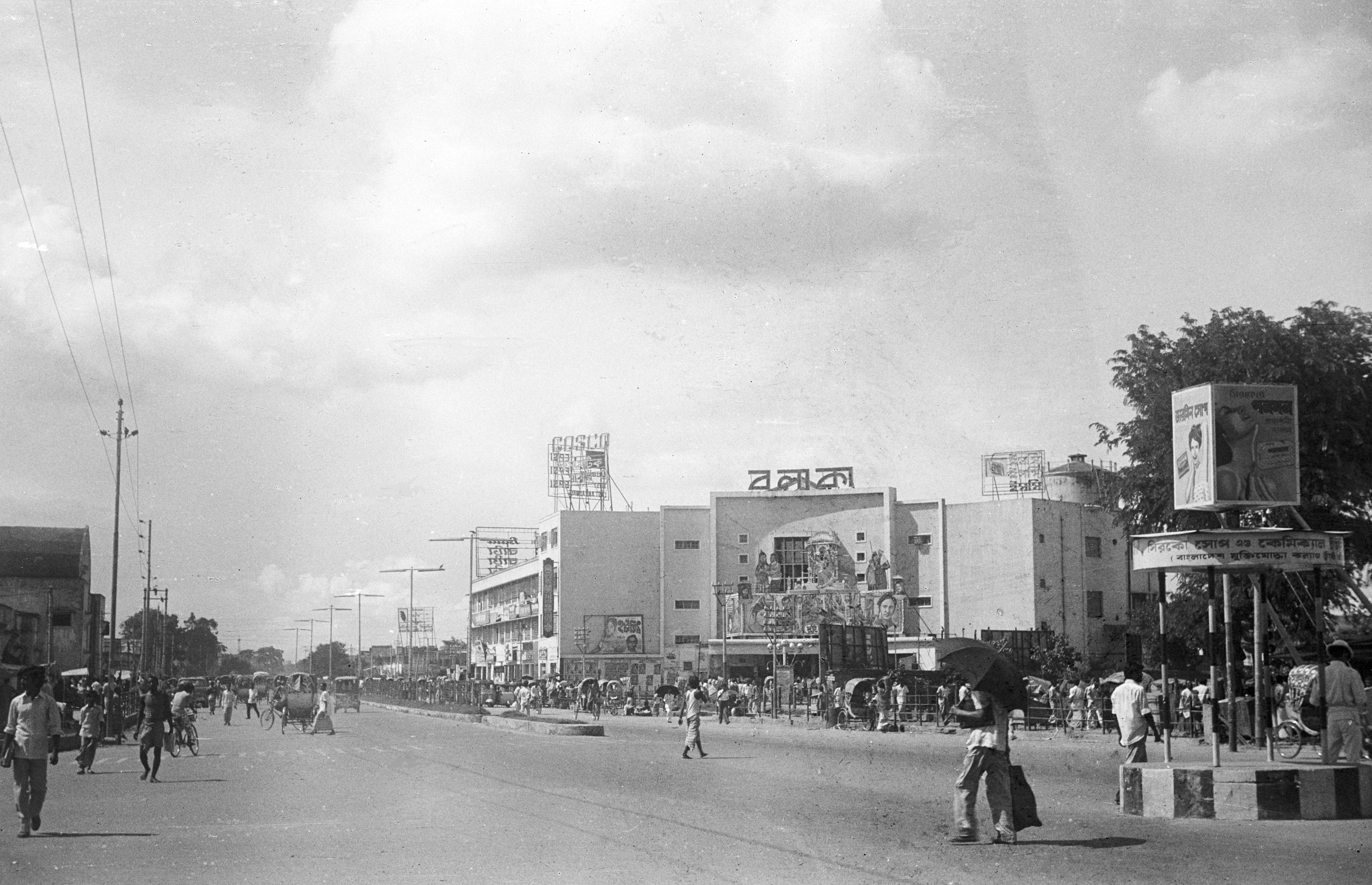
Roadway outside New Market (1975)
