= Dr. Muhammad Shahidullah Hall =

Residential hall of Dhaka University

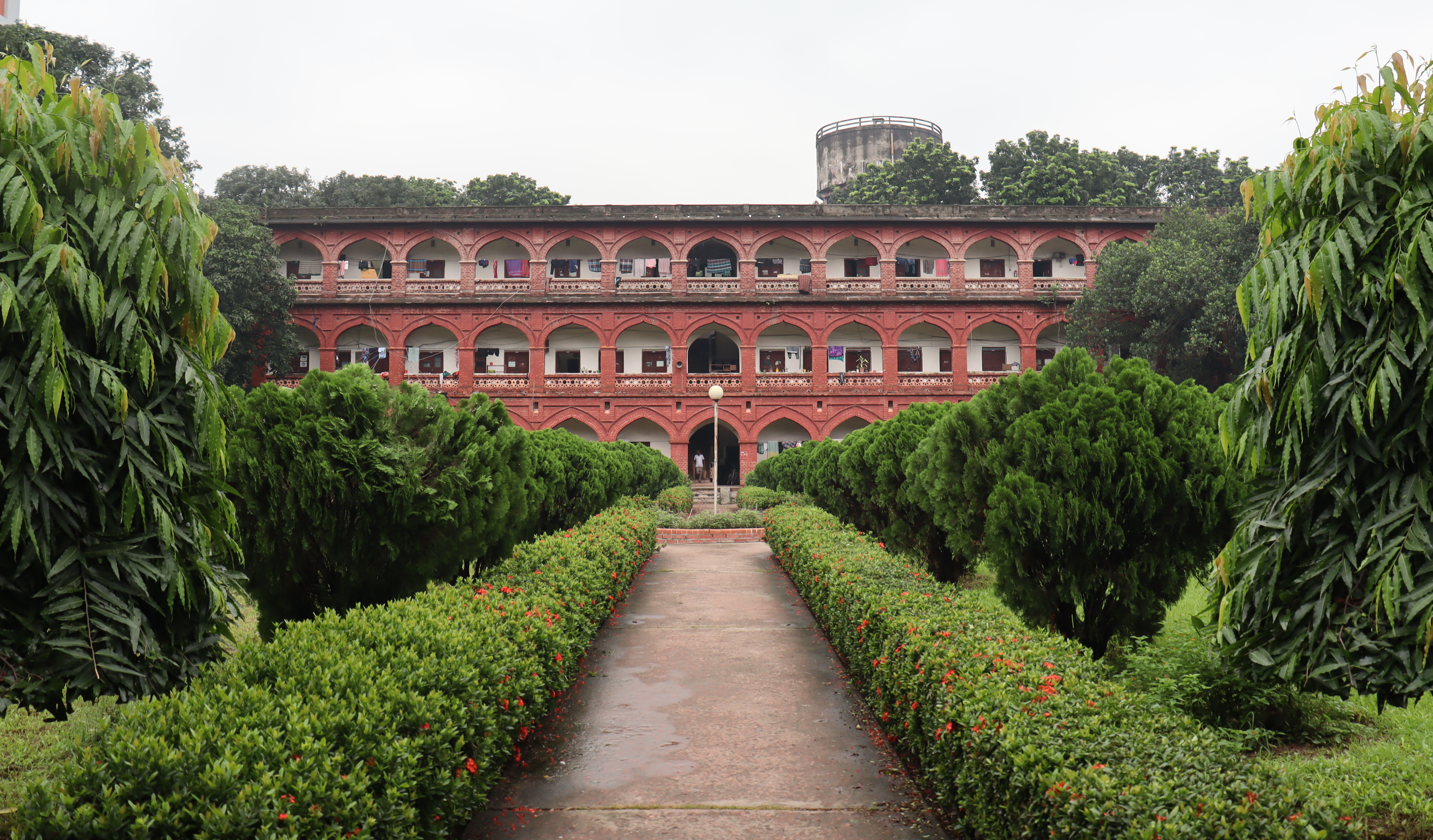
- Dr. Muhammad Shahidullah Hall

- Location within Bangladesh
- Former names: Dacca Hall; Shahidullah Hall
- Etymology: Muhammad Shahidullah, linguist

General information
- Status: In use
- Type: Quadrangle
- Location: University of Dhaka, Dhaka, Bangladesh
- Coordinates: 23.725807°N 90.401591°E
- Opened: 1921
- Owner: University of Dhaka

Technical details
- Floor count: 5

Dr. Muhammad Shahidullah Hall is one of the three founding residential halls of the University of Dhaka, located in Dhaka, Bangladesh. Established in 1921 as Dacca Hall, it was renamed as Shahidullah Hall for the famous linguist Muhammad Shahidullah following his death in 1969 and as Dr. Muhammad Shahidullah Hall in 2017.

Shahidullah is buried within the grounds.

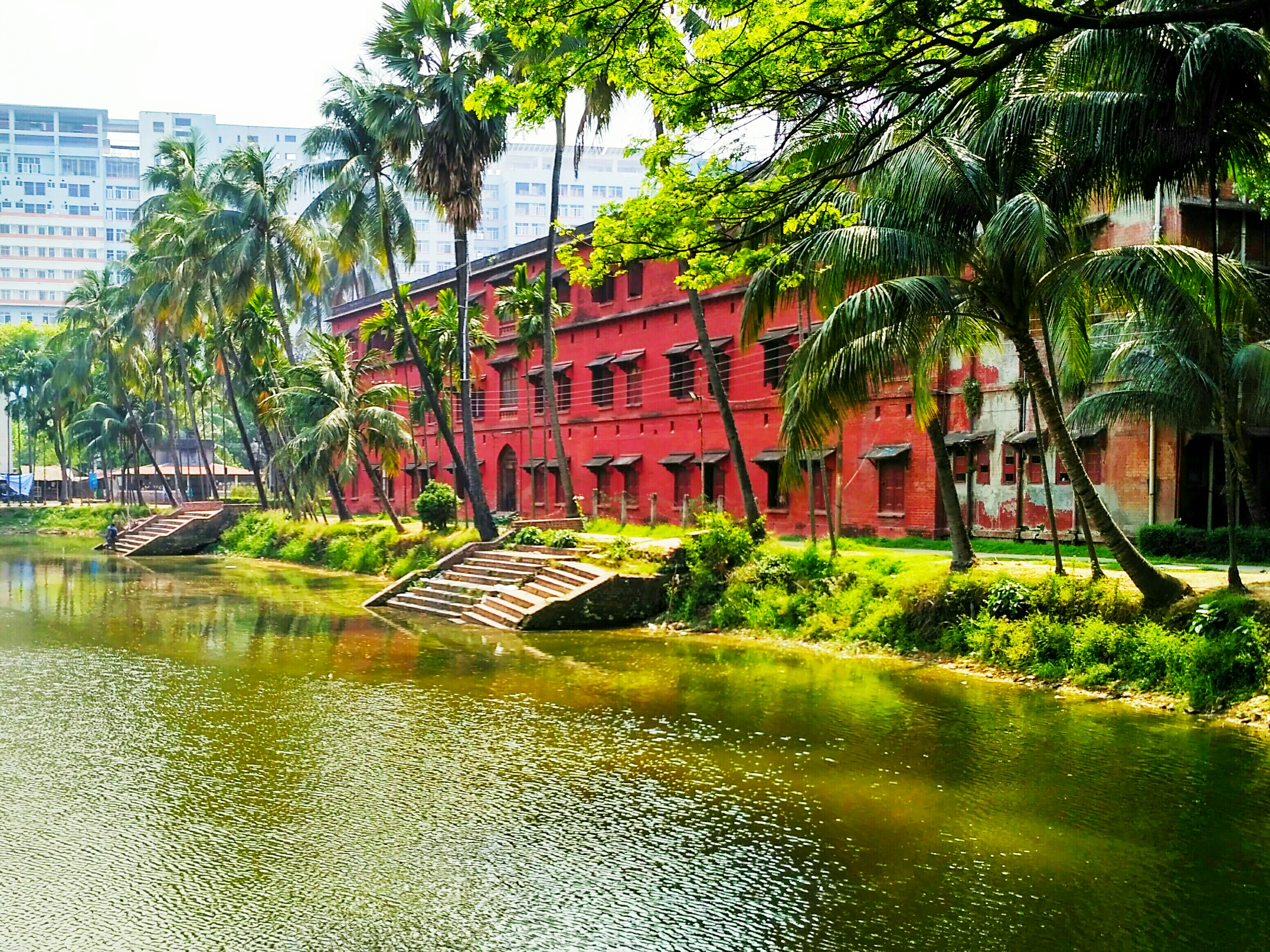
Dr. Muhammad Shahidullah Hall, three-storied main building at the west side of the pond

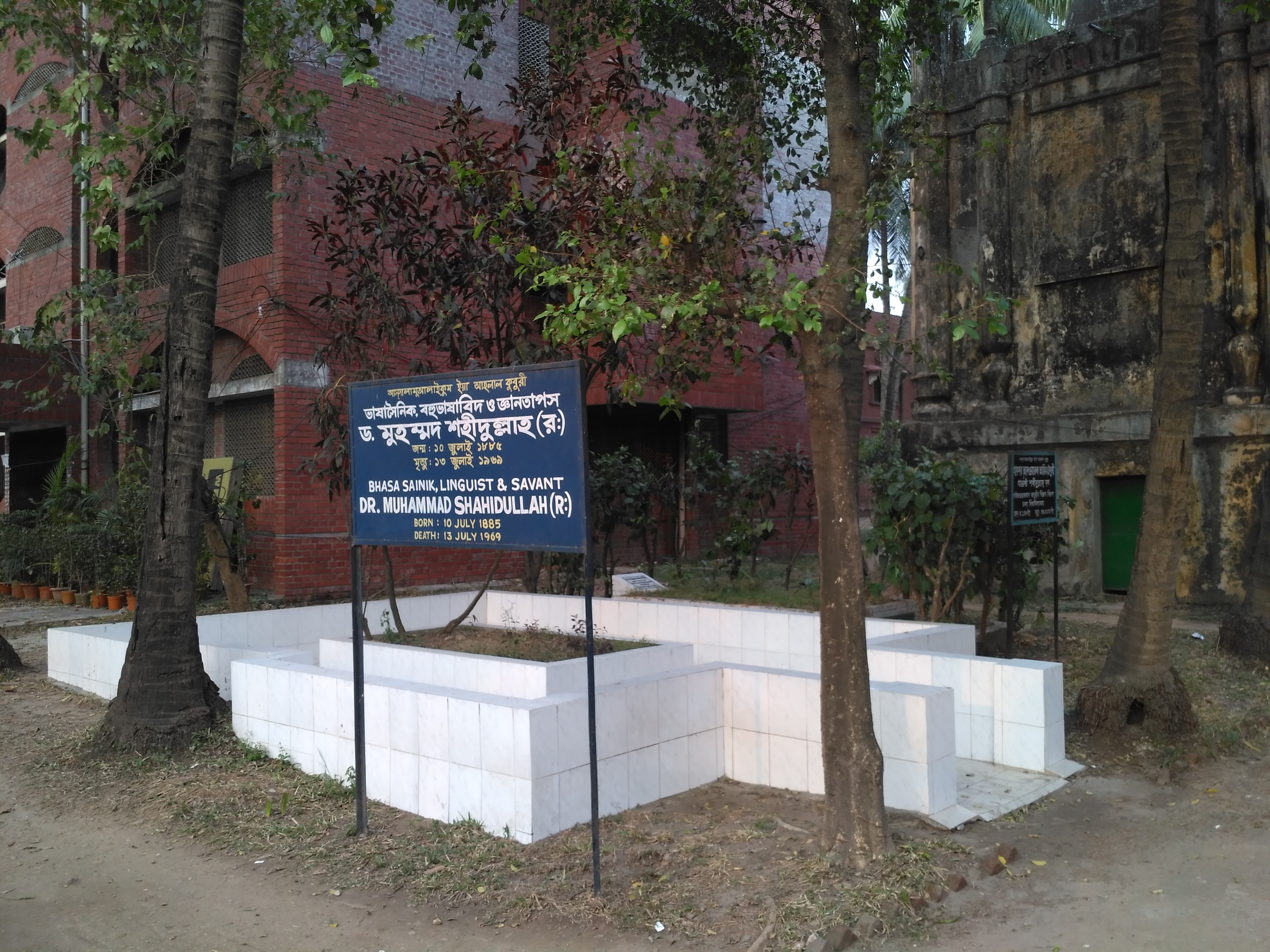
Grave of Dr. Muhammad Shahidullah near the hall

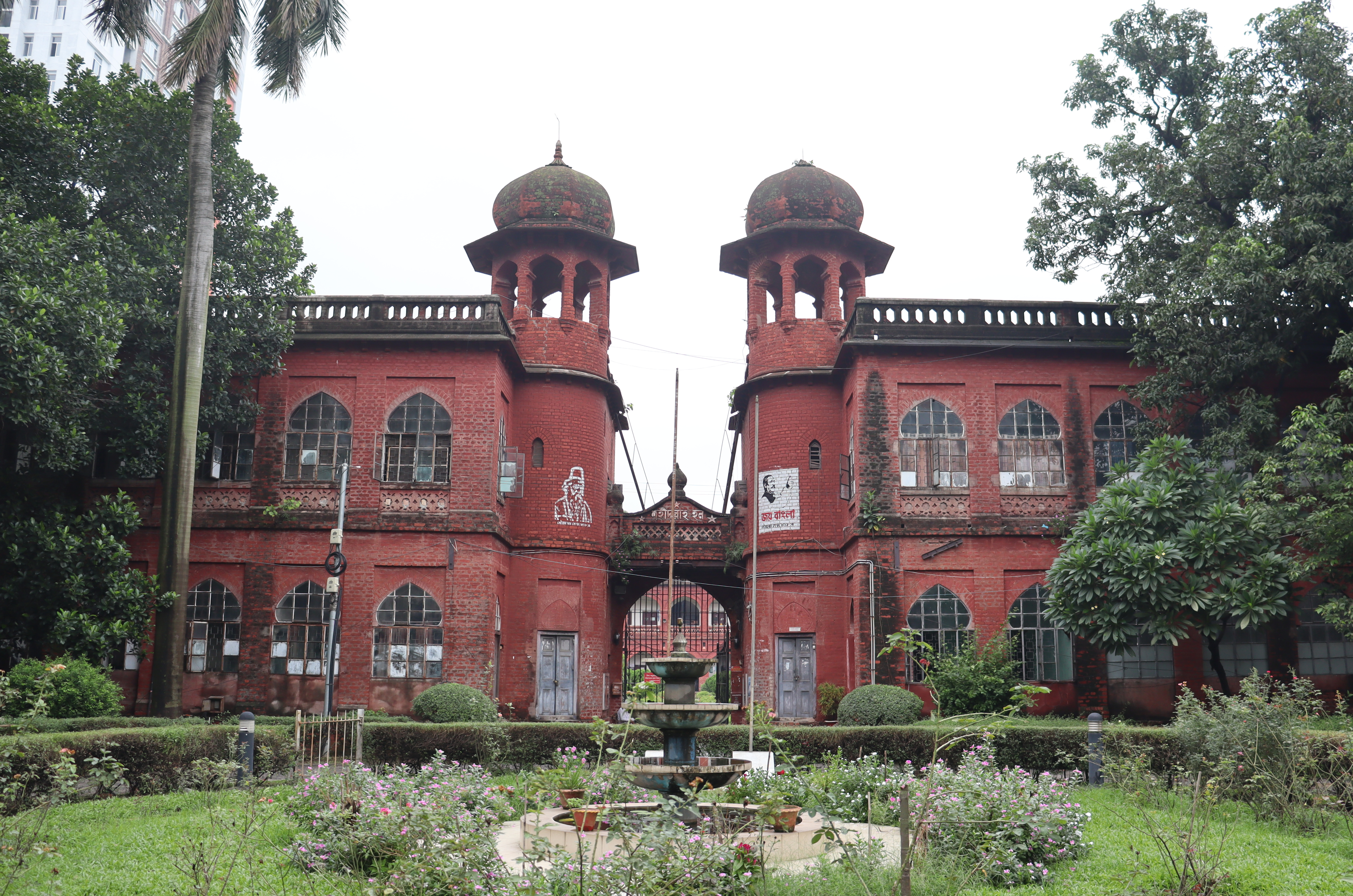
Entry gate of Dr. Muhammad Shahidullah Hall
