= List of streets in Dhaka =

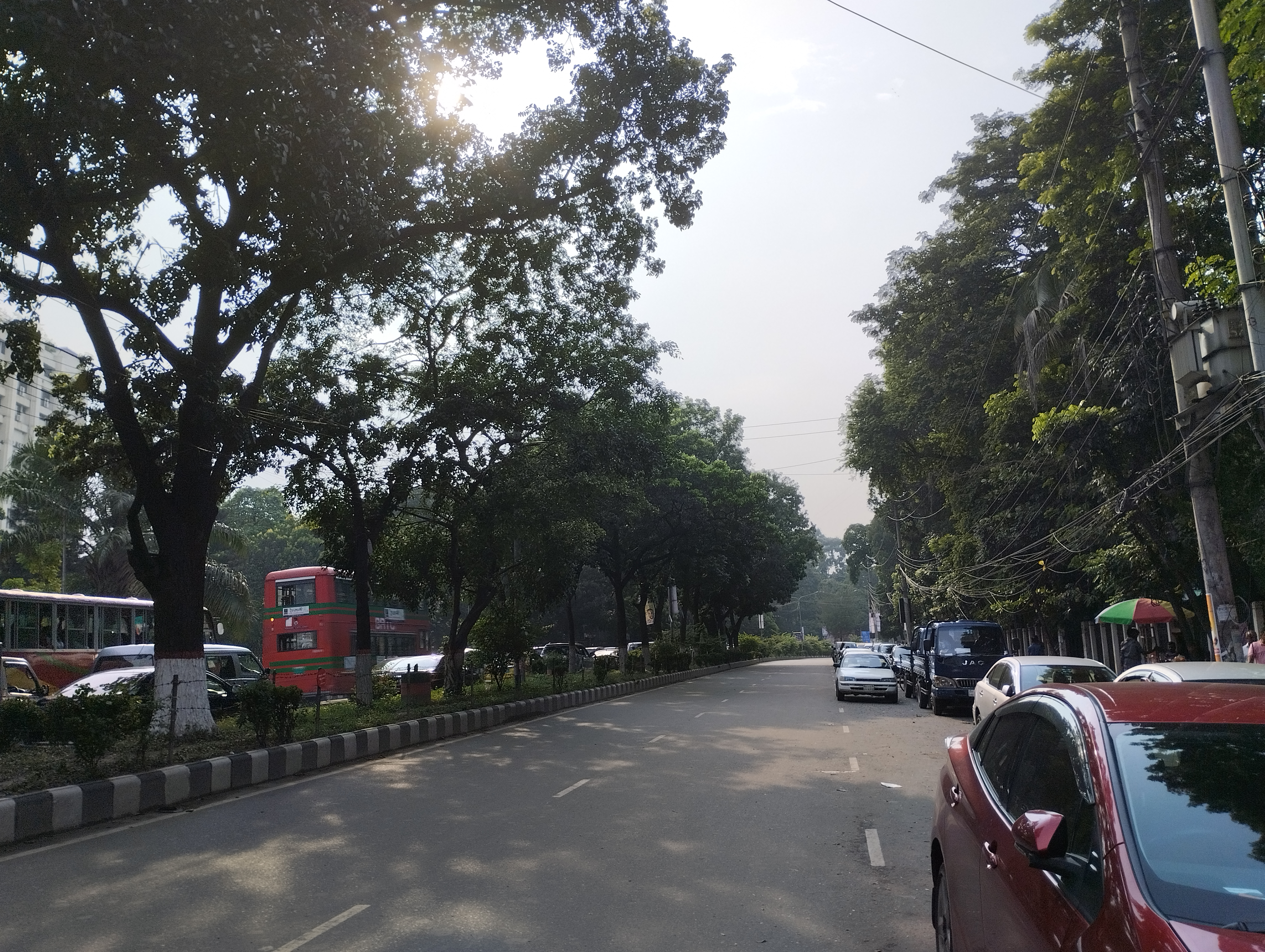
Abdul Goni Road, Dhaka

This is a list of streets in the city of Dhaka, Bangladesh.

== A ==
Street	Location/Route	Notes
Ahmed Sofa Sarani	Located east of Savar Upazila and west of Uttarkhan.	Previously called Mirpur DOHS–Uttara Road. Named after writer Ahmed Sofa.
Atish Dipankar Road	Located west of Mugdapara and east of Kamalapur railway station.	Previously called Peripheral Road ("প্যারিফ্যারিয়াল রোড"). Named after Atiśa, whose ashes reside in Kamalapur Dharmarajika Bauddha Vihara, located on the east side this road.
Abdul Gani Road		
Asad Avenue		

== B ==
Street	Route	Notes
B. K. Dash Road		
Bailey Road	East of Ramna Park to Shantinagar Road intersection	Divided into Bailey Road and New Bailey Road. Officially renamed Natok Avenue (নাটক সরণি) in 2005.
Bijoy Sarani		Named because Victory Day (bijoy dibosh) parades can be heard north of this road
Bir Uttam Rafiqul Islam Avenue		Named after Bir Uttam Rafiqul Islam
Bir Uttam Ziaur Rahman Road		Named After Bir Uttam Major Ziaur Rahman
Bir Uttam Major General Azizur Rahman Road		
Bir Uttam Khaled Mosarraf Avenue		

== C ==
Street	Location	Notes
Chittaranjan Avenue, Dhaka	Old Dhaka	Named After Chittaranjan Das

== D ==
Street	Route/Location	Notes
DIT Avenue	Motijeel	Named after former Dhaka Improvement Trust, which persists despite later being renamed RAJUK Street.
DIT Road	Rampura	

== E ==
Street	Route/Location	Notes
English Road	Links Nawabpur in the east and Noyabazar in the west.	One of Dhaka's oldest thoroughfares, it bears the name of the city's former Divisional Commissioner.
Eskaton Garden Road		

== F ==
Street	Route/Location	Landmarks	Notes
Fuller Road		Residence of Dhaka University's Vice Chancellor, British Council, Udayan School, and the Freedom Struggle (স্বাধীনতা সংগ্রাম) monument.	In honour of Bampfylde Fuller, the first Lieutenant Governor of the province of Eastern Bengal and Assam. Officially renamed Sir Syed Ahmad Road by the municipality in 1967.

== G ==
Street	Route/Location	Landmarks	Notes
Green Road	Dhanmondi		
Gulshan Avenue	Main Road of Gulshan		
Gulshan-Badda Link Road	Gulshan-Badda		
Gulshan North Avenue	Gulshan		
Garib E Newaz Avenue	Uttara		
Gausul Azam Avenue	Uttara		

== H ==
Street	Route/Location	Landmarks	Notes
Hare Road	Ramna Thana	Official residence of the Chief Justice, state guest houses, Ramna Park.	Named after Lancelot Hare, the second Lieutenant Governor of Eastern Bengal and Assam.
Hatirjeel Link Road	Hatirjeel Thana		

== I ==
Street	Route	Notes
Indira Road		
Iqbal Road		Built as part of a neighborhood for the rehabilitation of Muhajirs during Pakistani rule. Named after the poet Muhammad Iqbal.

== J ==
Street	Route	Landmarks	Notes
Jashimuddin Avenue			
Johnson Road	Chittaranjan Avenue to Dholaikhal Road	Dhaka Baptist Church, Ray Shaheb Bazar. Also the location of the historical Azad cinema hall.	Connects to Sadarghat to the south. Named after Luttman Johnson, who served as Dhaka's District Magistrate in 1893 and Divisional Commissioner in 1909–1910. Briefly renamed Liaquat Avenue after Pakistan's first prime minister Liaquat Ali Khan.

== K ==
Street	Route	Notes
Kazi Nazrul Islam Avenue		
Katabon Road		
Kamal Atatürk Avenue		

== L ==
Street	Route	Notes
Love Road, Mirpur		
Love Road, Tejgaon		

== M ==
Street	Route/Location	Notes
Madani Avenue	Major road of Baridhara in Dhaka.	Named after DIT (now Rajuk) Chairman G. M. Madani.
Minto Road	Major road of Ramna Area in Dhaka.	Named after Viceroy of India Lord Minto.
Manik Mia Avenue	The south avenue of Bangladesh national parliament house Complex in Sher E Bangla Nagar in Dhaka.	Named after Tofazzal Hossain Manik Miah
Maulana Bhasani Road		Named after Maulana Bhasani
Moghbazar Road		

== N ==
Street	Route	Notes
Nawabpur Road		
New Elephant road		
Nilkhet road		
New Eskaton Road		
Nazimuddin road		
Nababpur Road		
Narinda Road		

== O ==
Street	Route	Notes
Orphanage Road	Bakshibazar in the west to Dhakeshwari Temple	Originally named after an orphanage built for Hindu children in the early 20th century, it was officially renamed Shahid Avenue in the 1980s by the city corporation.
Old Elephant Road		
Outer Circular Road		

== P ==
Street	Route	Notes
Panthapath		
Pragati Sarani		
Pyari Das Road		Named in 1916 after Pyarilal Das, who served as the municipal chairman.

== R ==
Street	Route	Notes
Rishikesh Das Road		
Rokeya Sarani	Starts after Shewrapara and Kazipara in Mirpur, to Mirpur-10 roundabout.	Named after Begum Rokeya in the 1970s when it was the main thoroughfare connecting the rest of Dhaka.
Rankin Street		
Rabindra Sarani		

== S ==
Street	Route	Notes
Sangsad Avenue		Links the National Parliament (sangsad) building.
Sat Masjid Road		
Shaheed Abrar Fahad Avenue		Named after Abrar Fahad in 2024.
Shaheed Salim Ullah Road		
Simson Road		Named after Dhaka's Divisional Commissioner in the 1870s.
Sonargaon Janapath		
Shahid Minar Road		
Secretariat Road		
Shahid Tajuddin Ahmed Avenue		
Shahid Sanbadik Selina Parvin Road		
Sheikh Tamim highway		
Sayed Mahbub Morshed Road		
Shia Masjid Road		
Sher-e-Bangla Road		

== T ==
Street	Location	Notes
Topkhana Road	Segunbagicha	
Toyenbee Circular Road	Motijeel	
Tipu Sultan Road	Old Dhaka	
Tajmahal Road	Mohammadpur	

== U ==
Street	Route	Notes
University Street		

== W ==
Street	Route/Location	Notes
Wapda Road	Rampura	
Water Works Road		Named by the municipality in 1878, coinciding with the inauguration of Dhaka Water Works alongside it.

== Z ==
Street	Route	Notes
Zahir Raihan Road		

== Bibliography ==
- Ahmed, Sharifuddin; Hasan, Delwar; Majlish, Najma Khan; Rabbani, AKM Golam, eds. (June 2012). Encyclopedia of Dhaka ঢাকা কোষ (in Bengali). Dhaka: Asiatic Society of Bangladesh. ISBN 978-984-512-019-7.
