= Bangladesh Bauddha Kristi Prachar Sangha =

Buddhist political and social organisation

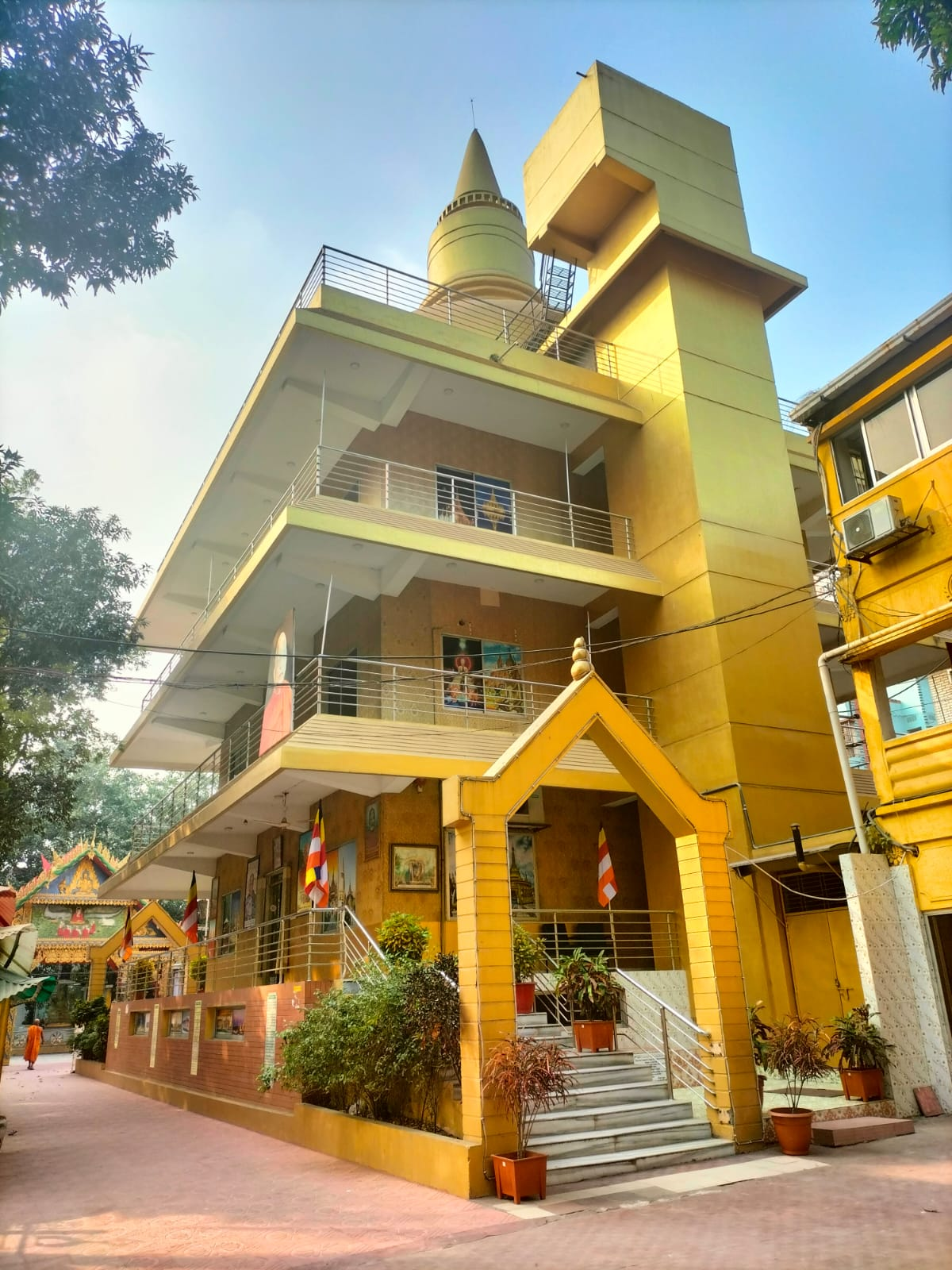
The Headquarter

Bangladesh Bauddha Kristi Prachar Sangha is a political and social organization that works for the welfare of the Buddhist community of Bangladesh.

== History ==
Bangladesh Bauddha Kristi Prachar Sangha was established on 4 December 1949 as the East Pakistan Bauddha Kristi Prachar Sangha at the Lakhera Abhoy Vihara, Patiya Upazila, Chittagong Division, East Pakistan. Its founding President was Dharmadarshi Mahathera and the founding General Secretary was Bangish Bhikkhu. The organization campaigned for quotas in jobs and educational institutes for the minority Buddhist community. In 1954, Sudhangshu Bimal Barua was elected to the East Pakistan Assembly on a nomination of the Bauddha Kristi Prachar Sangha from a reserved constituency. In 1960, Kamalapur Dharmarajika Bauddha Vihara was established and became the headquarters of the Bauddha Kristi Prachar Sangha. The temple also housed a school and an orphanage. In 1962, King Bhumibol Adulyadej and Queen Sirikit of Thailand visited the temple.

Bishuddhananda Mahathera, president of the Bauddha Kristi Prachar Sangha, visited China in 1968 and requested the return of Atiśa ashes from China. In 1971, after the Bangladesh Liberation War, the East Pakistan Bauddha Kristi Prachar Sangha was renamed Bangladesh Bauddha Kristi Prachar Sangha. In 1978, China handed over the ashes of Atiśa to the Sangha. In 1983, the Bangladesh Bauddha Kristi Prachar Sangha celebrated the 1000th birth anniversary of Atiśa. The Sangha organized an international conference on Paharpur Buddhist civilisation in 1987. The organization has also established a temple in Bodh Gaya in India. In 2018, the President of the Sangha filled out an application for a university license, the proposed name is Sanghanayek Sradmananda Mahathero University.
