= Janani O Gorbito Bornomala =

Sculpture made by Mrinal Haque

- জননী ও গর্বিত বর্ণমালা (Bengali)
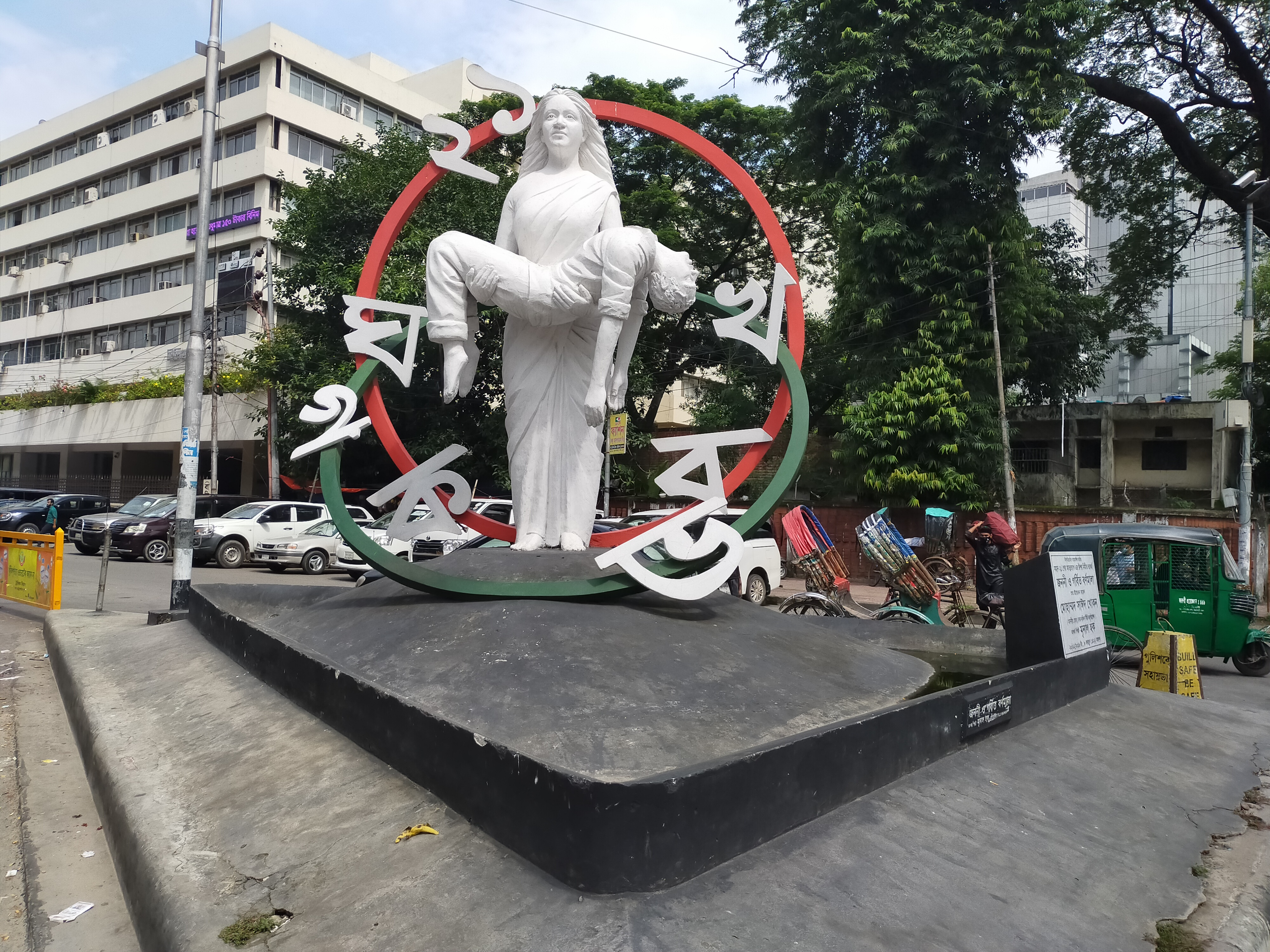
- Artist: Mrinal Haque
- Year: 20 February 2016
- Subject: Bangla language movement
- Dimensions: 490 cm (16 ft)
- Location: Dhaka; 23.742723°N 90.395901°E
- Owner: Dhaka South City Corporation

Janani O Gorbito Bornomala (Bengali: জননী ও গর্বিত বর্ণমালা, lit. 'Mother and proud albhabets') is a sculpture of a mother protesting while carrying her son's corpse. One of notable work of Mrinal Haque for Dhaka City. It is situated in front of the BTCL headquarter at the junction of Kazi Nazrul Islam Avenue near Bangla Motor, in Dhaka city's Paribagh. It was erected on the theme of Bangla language movement. The sculpture was inaugurated on February 20, 2016. This is one of sculptures erected by Haque's private funding.

== Background and description ==
"I felt that besides Shaheed Minar, there is no other significant monument that symbolizes our language movement. There should be. Thus, I sculpted the monument 'Shaheed Janani O Gorbito Bornomala'."

— Mrinal Haque

Mrinal Haque wanted to erect another significant sculpture on the theme of language movement. He felt that there should be another monument besides Shaheed Minar on such theme. The symbol of the sculpture is the sacrifice of the mother and child and the struggle for the independence of Bangladesh.

A mother in despair holding the body of her in her arms is depicted as a symbolic protest. The sculpture Mother and Child is surrounded by two red and green circles. Red-green circles symbolize the flag of Bangladesh; As well as the red color is a symbol of sacrifice and blood and the green color is a symbol of peace and life. In front of the sculpture there are a few Bengali alphabets in a green circle. Behind the red circle are '21' in Bengali. The sculpture is 16 feet high and has Bengali alphabet and numbers.

== Gallery ==
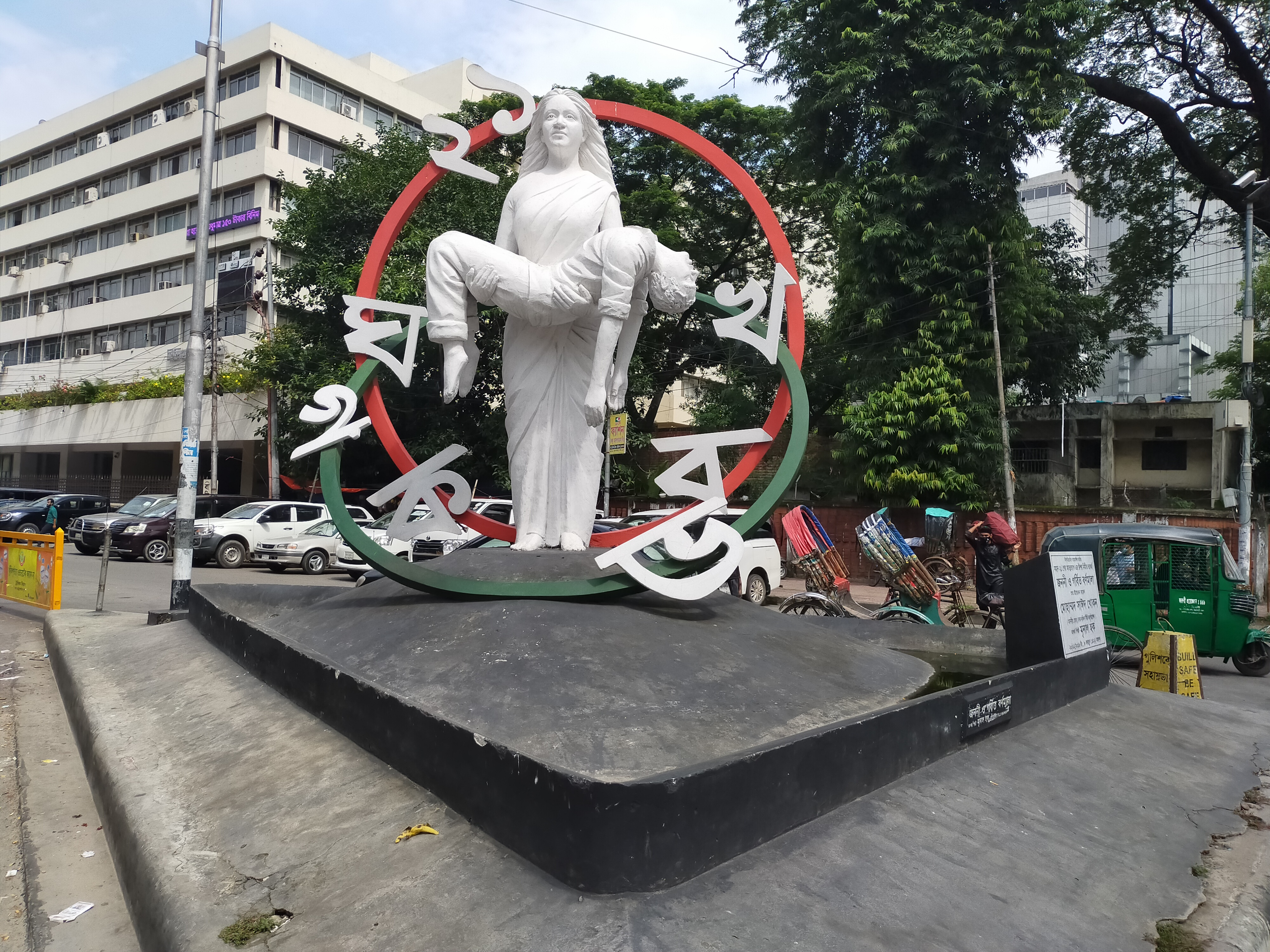
Close up frontal view

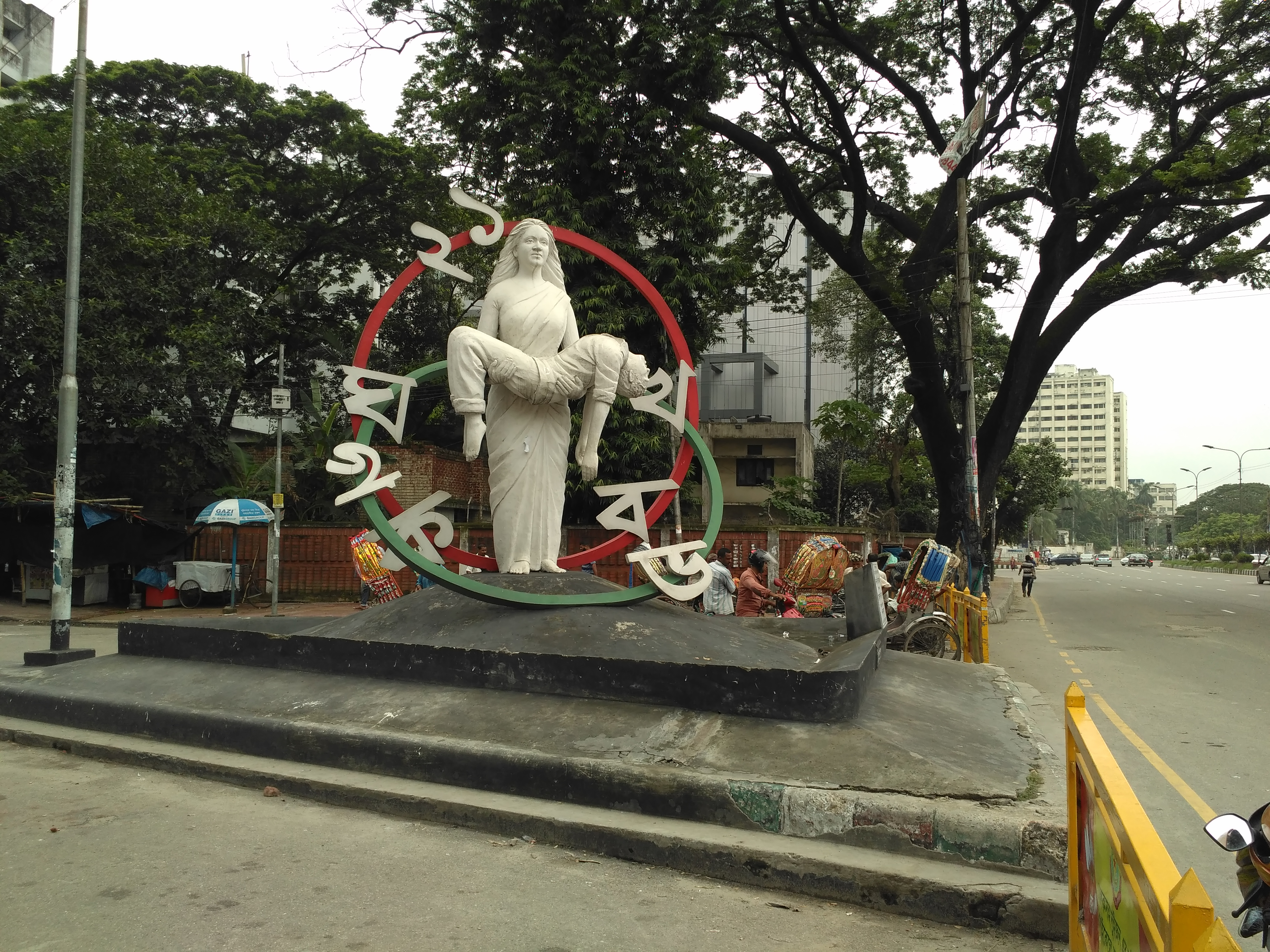
Front view 2

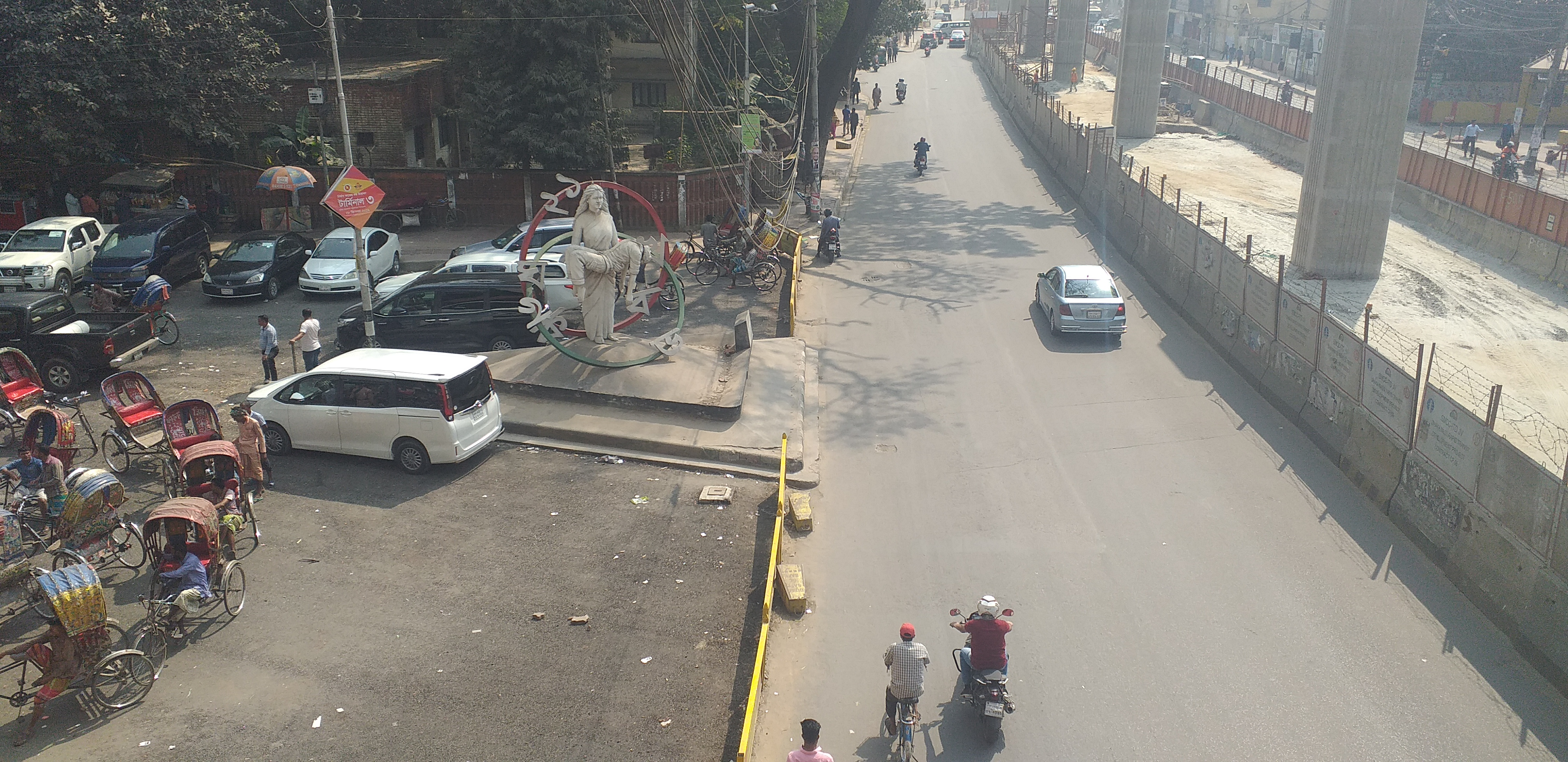
From Nazrul Islam Avenue
