= Love Road =

Love Road may refer to:

- Love Road, Mirpur
- Love Road, Tejgaon
