= Minto Road =

Road in Dhaka, Bangladesh

- Namesake: Gilbert Elliot-Murray-Kynynmound, 4th Earl of Minto
- Type: Street
- Maintained by: Dhaka North City Corporation, Dhaka South City Corporation
- Length: 1 km (0.62 mi)
- Location: Dhaka
- East end: Moghbazar Road
- West end: Kazi Nazrul Islam Avenue

Minto Road is a road in Ramna in Dhaka that houses the official residences of many Minister and High government officials of Bangladesh.

== Description ==
The road starts at Rajosik Bihar Sculpture Square or Properly known as InterContinental Dhaka interchange near Shahbag where it meets with Kazi Nazrul Islam Avenue and ends at Kotowal Sculpture Square just beside DMP Headquarters where it junction with Moghbazar Road. The Road often compare to the Downing Street due to the residences of Ministers of Bangladesh.

== Landmarks ==
- Hotel Intercontinental
- BSMMU Conference Hall.
- DMP Headquarters.
- Residences of Opposition leader of Bangladesh.
- Jamuna State Guest House.
- Dhaka district Commissioner Banglow.

== See also ==
- List of streets in Dhaka.
