= Agnijhora-71 =

- Artist: Mrinal Haque
- Year: 27 November 2015
- Medium: Iron, cast stone
- Subject: Bangladesh Liberation War
- Location: Barguna; 24.2120002°N 89.2762227°E
- Owner: Barguna Municipality

Agnijhora-71 (or Agnijhora Ekattor) is a commemorative sculpture dedicated to the Bangladesh Liberation War. The monument was conceived and built by Mrinal Haque in 2015, funded by the Barguna Municipality, and installed at the Town Hall intersection in Barguna. The sculpture symbolizes the participation of people from all walks of life in the Liberation War. On a similar theme, Haque also created Protyasha in 2008.

== Background ==
During the Bangladesh Liberation War, Mrinal Haque was a student of Rajshahi Cadet College. He twice attempted to escape to join the war. While fleeing, he witnessed the killing of students and teachers by the Pakistan Army at the Sarada rail crossing, which deeply moved him. This incident inspired him to create sculptures based on Bangladesh’s Liberation War. The Barguna Municipality also expressed an interest in setting up a Liberation War-themed monument.

== Construction and impact ==
The Agnijhora-71 sculpture represents a group of four armed freedom fighters — an intellectual, a farmer, a student, and a woman. The sculpture, coated in white, was built with cast stone over an iron framework. Mrinal Haque completed the work in about one and a half months. He also named the sculpture himself. The sculpture was officially inaugurated on 27 November 2015. After its installation, the Barguna Town Hall intersection was renamed "Swadhinata Square" (Independence Square).
