= Rajosik Bihar =

Sculpture made by Mrinal Haque

- রাজসিক বিহার (Bengali)
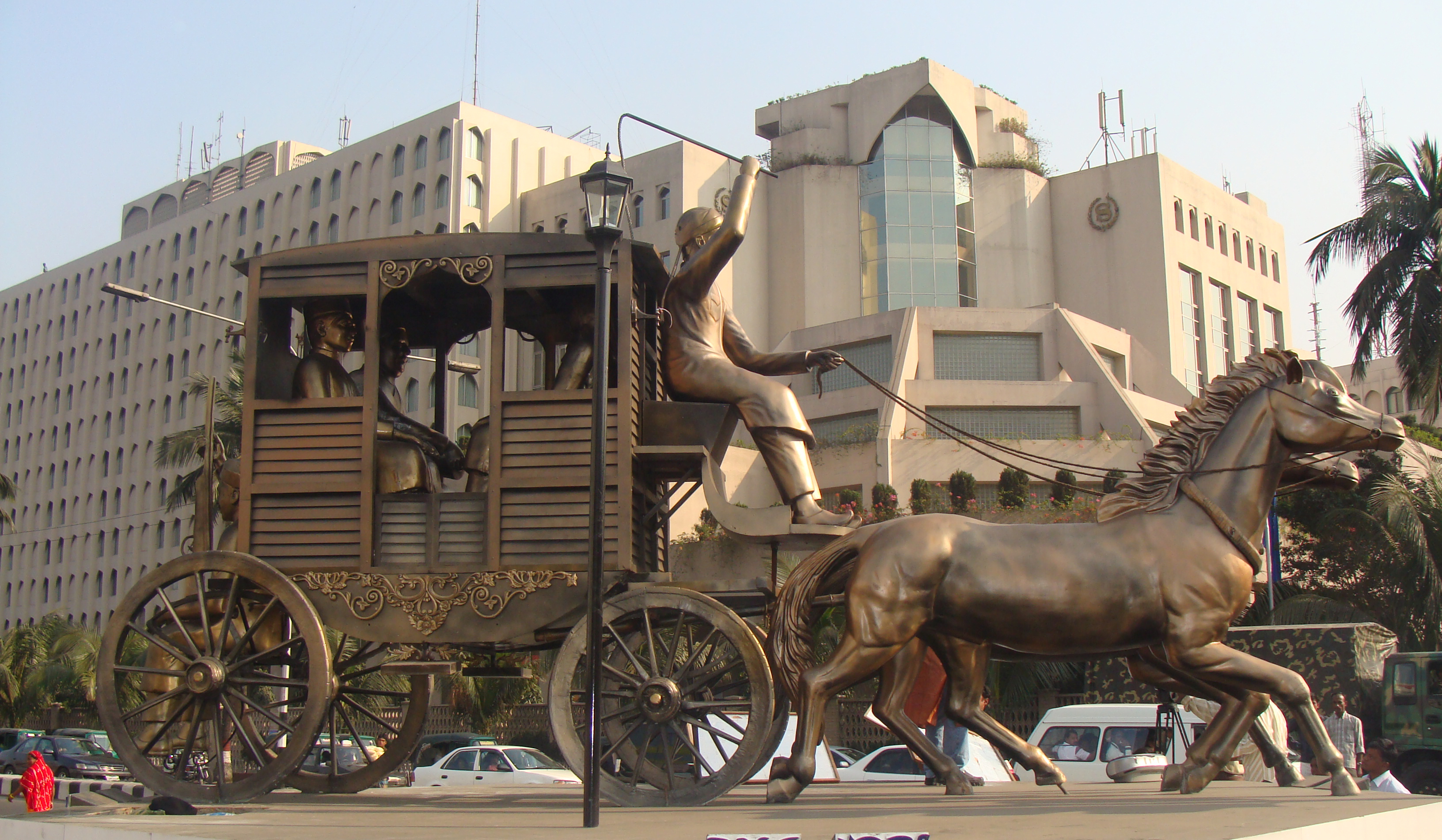
- Artist: Mrinal Haque
- Year: 19 January 2008
- Subject: Nawab of Dhaka
- Location: Dhaka; 23.741579°N 90.396152°E
- Owner: Dhaka City Corporation

Rajosik Bihar (also known as Rajosik) is a sculpture of a horse-drawn carriage made by Mrinal Haque. It is situated in front of the Sheraton Hotel at the junction of Kazi Nazrul Islam Avenue and Minto Road in Dhaka city's Paribagh. It was erected on the theme of the regal tour of Dhaka city with the families of Nawabs and Zamindars. The sculpture was unveiled on 19 January 2008, as part of the beautification project to mark the 400th anniversary of the city of Dhaka, led by city corporation. This was one of sculptures erected by Haque's private funding.

== Background and description ==
"To celebrate the 400th anniversary of historical town Dhaka another sculpture titled Rajoshik has been installed, in which figures of Nawab Salimullah and his family have been created on a horse carriage."

— Mrinal Haque

The Nawab-zamindars of Dhaka used to have two fast horses in their carriages when they went out to roam with their family members. Pedestrians, other horse-drawn carriages and vehicles moved to one side to ensure the smooth movement of their vehicles. this is backdrop that Mrinal Haque used as the theme to build the sculpture, emphasizing the tradition of traveling to Dhaka. In the sculpture, Nawab Salimullah along with his wife, son and with his guard going out to see the city in such a rigal style.

The entire sculpture is covered in golden color. The front of the four-wheeler is towards Paribagh and the rear is towards Minty Road. In the sculpture, a driver is controlling two horses, Nawab is sitting with his family inside the car and a bodyguard is sitting in the back of the car with a gun in his hand. There is a lantern standing on the right side of the sculptural passenger cabin.

== Gallery ==
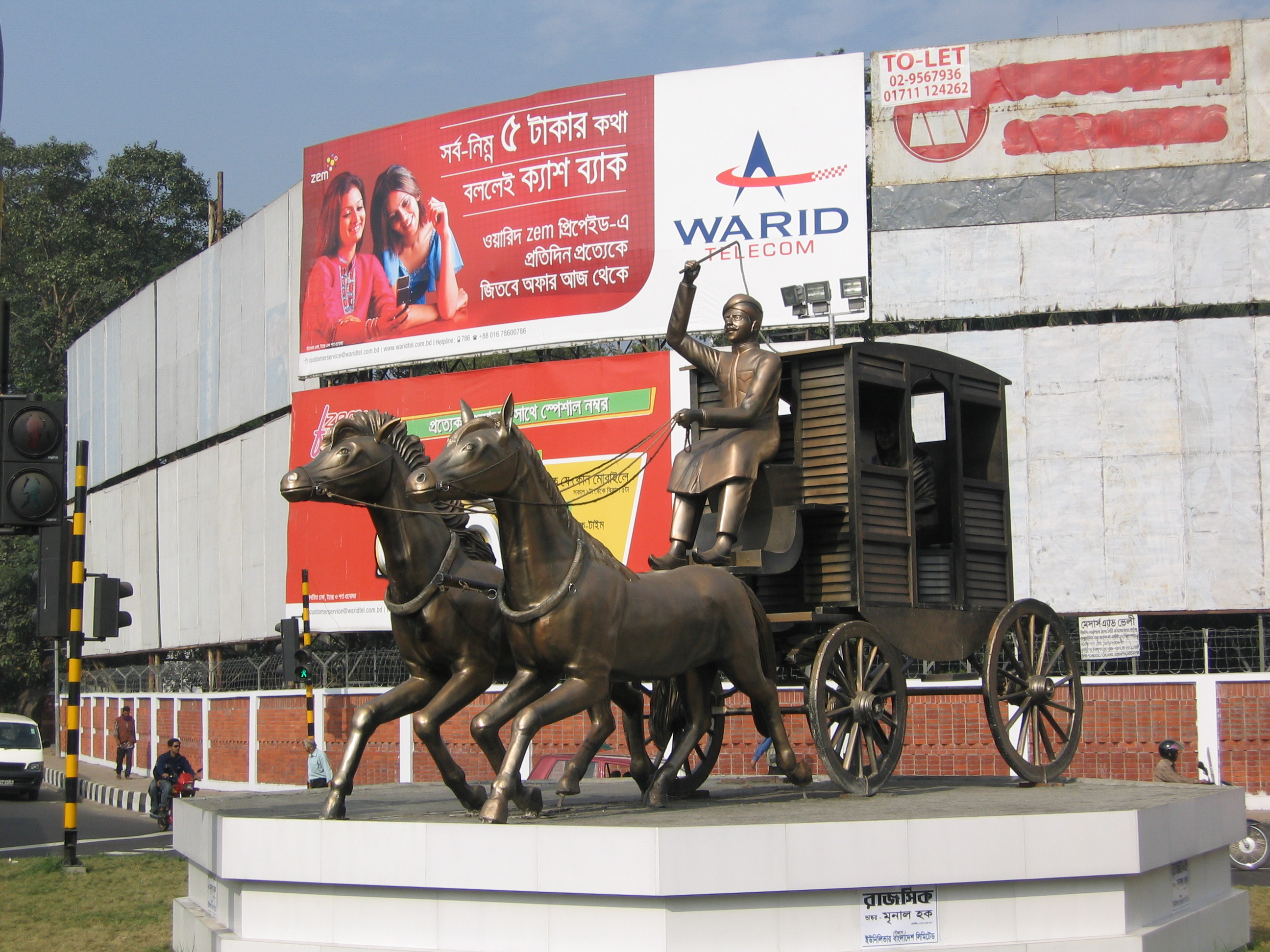

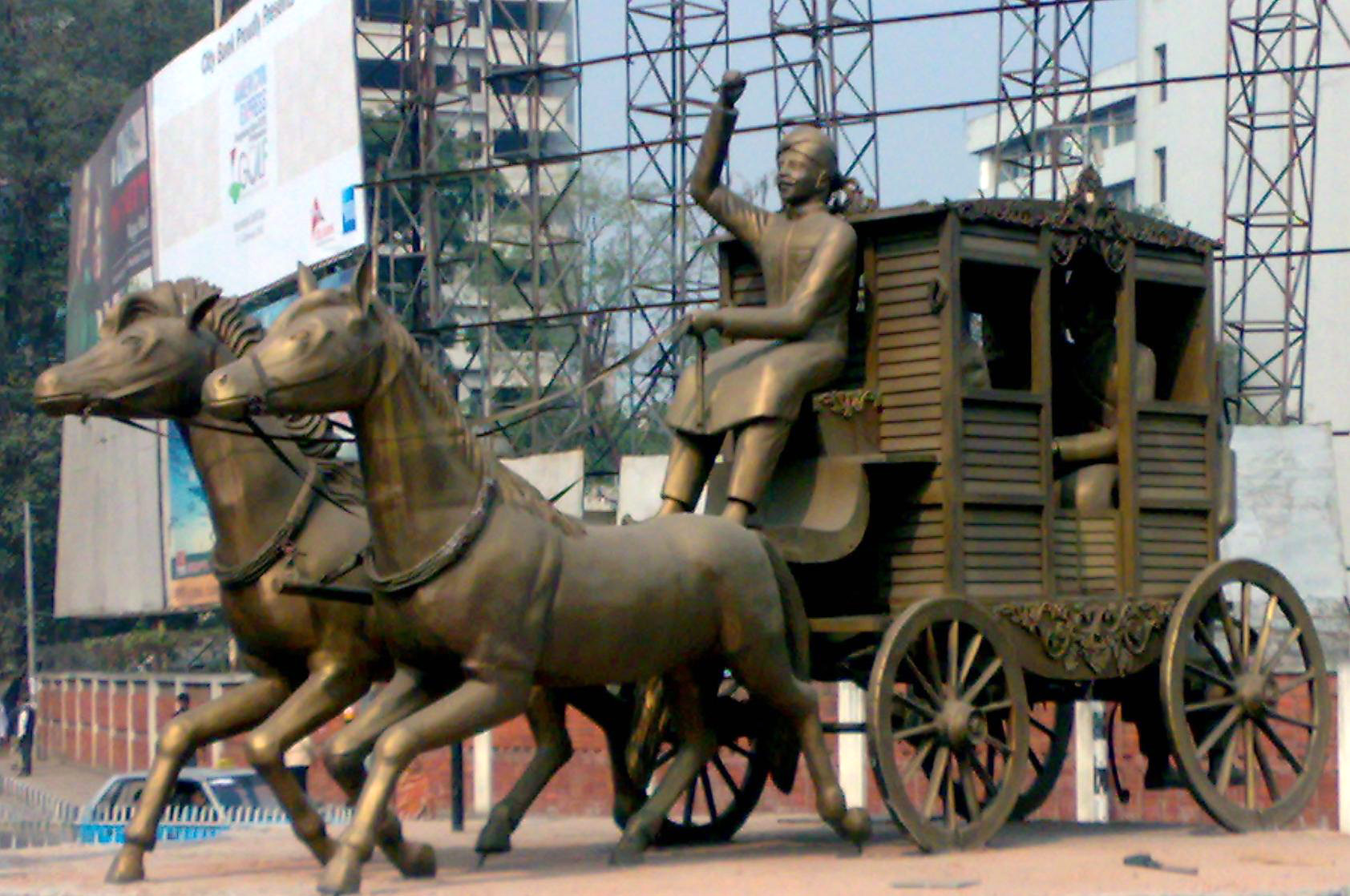

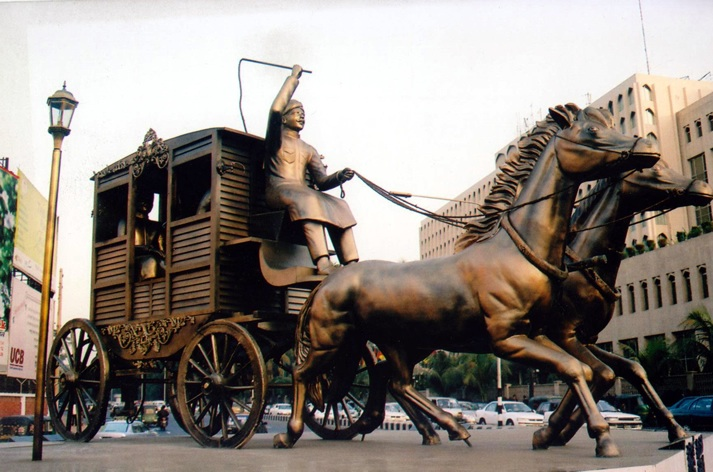
