= Basabo =

Neighbourhood in Dhaka, Bangladesh

Basabo বাসাবো
- Neighbourhood
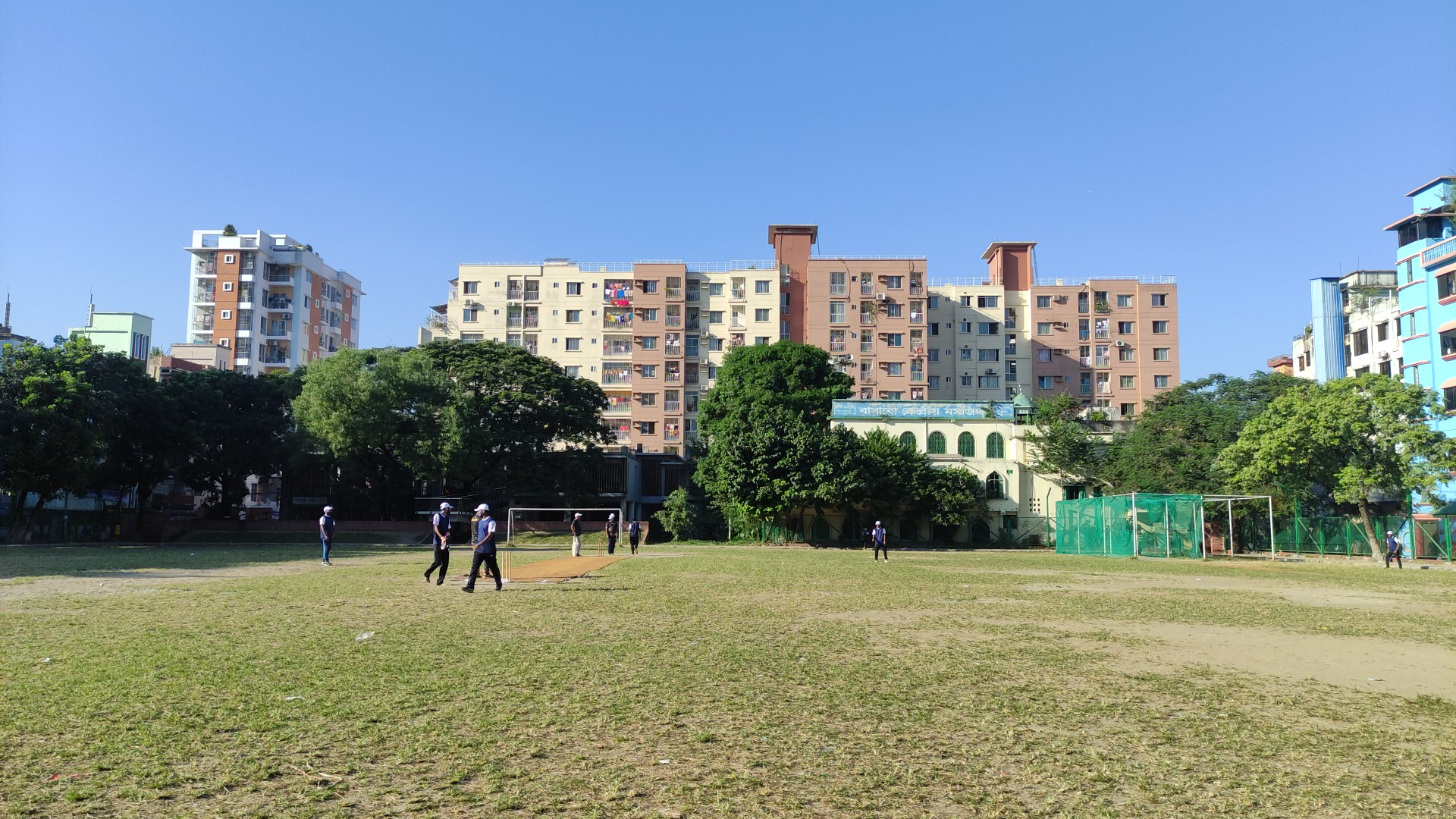
- Basabo Playground
- Interactive map of Basabo
- Coordinates (Basabo–Madartek road): 23°44′25″N 90°25′50″E
- Country: Bangladesh
- City: Dhaka
- Municipality: Dhaka South City Corporation
- Thana: Sabujbagh Thana

Government
  - MPs: Habibur Rashid Habib (Bangladesh Nationalist Party)
- Time zone: UTC+6

Basabo or Bashabo (Bengali: বাসাবো) is a neighbourhood in Sabujbagh Thana of Dhaka city, Bangladesh. It is encompassed by Dhaka South City Corporation wards 4 and 5. The area is administered under the Dhaka-9 constituency of the Jatiya Sangsad and is divided into North Basabo, South Basabo, East Basabo, West Basabo, and Middle Basabo.

The neighbourhood, located east of Kamalapur railway station on Atish Dipankar Road, is intersected by Basabo–Madartek road and Basabo Buddha Mandir road.

In 2020, Basabo was identified as one of the most affected areas in Dhaka during the COVID-19 pandemic.

== Points of interest ==
Dharmarajika Bauddha Vihara, the first Buddhist monastery in Dhaka, was established in Bashabo in 1960. It functions as the cultural and regional centre of Bangladeshi Buddhists.

== Recreation and entertainment ==
Bir Muktijoddha Shaheed Alauddin Playground (Bashabo Playground) was opened to the public after renovations in 2019 and remains the primary recreational facility for residents. It has a children's play area, a food court and contains the Basabo Tarun Sangha (Bashabo Youth Association) building, which hosts a library, gymnasium and indoor sports rooms.

Bashabo Sobuj Boloy (Bashabo Balur Maath) fairground, undergoing a complete renovation project funded by the World Bank, wa

s scheduled to reopen in 2024 with upgraded facilities and design, but multiple delays in project implementation is postponing the opening of the ground.

Basabo Tarun Sangha, a sports club established in 1956, has a football team that participates in Dhaka's domestic football league.

== Schools ==
- Motijheel Model School and College, Basabo Branch
- Sobujbag Government High School
- Sobujbag Government College
- Kamalapur School and College
- Kadamtola Purbo Bashabo School & College
- Basabo Girl's High School
- Dip Shikha Pre Cadet School and College
- Dharmarajika High School
- South Basabo Govt Primary School
- Shaheed Zia Basabo High School
- Rajarbagh Ideal School
- Bright Four Laboratory School and College.
- Mystic International School
- Moonlight International School
- The Educators
