= Sabujbagh Thana =

Thana in Dhaka South City Corporation, Bangladesh

Sabujbagh Thana সবুজবাগ থানা
- Thana
- Expandable map of vicinity of Sabujbagh Thana
- Coordinates: 23.74199°N 90.4565°E
- Country: Bangladesh
- Division: Dhaka Division
- District: Dhaka District
- Formed: 1988

Area
  - Total: 6.62 km^{2} (2.56 sq mi)
- Elevation: 23 m (75 ft)

Population (2022)
  - Total: 258,515
  - Density: 39,100/km^{2} (101,000/sq mi)
- Time zone: UTC+6 (BST)
- Postal code: 1214
- Area code: 02

Sabujbagh (Bengali: সবুজবাগ) is a thana (police jurisdiction) in Dhaka District in Dhaka, Bangladesh. Situated in the administrative area of Dhaka South City Corporation, the thana was formed in 1988. The police station is located at holding number 203 in Middle Bashabo.

== Geography ==
Sabujbagh is bounded by Khilgaon Thana on the north, Jatrabari Thana on the south, Demra Thana and Jatrabari on the east, Motijheel and Sutrapur Thana on the west. It has a land area of 6.62 square kilometres (2.56 mi^{2}).

== Demographics ==
Religions in Sabujbag Thana (2022)
Religion	Percent
Islam	94.12%
Hinduism	4.92%
Buddhism	0.88%
Other or not stated	0.08%

According to the 2022 Bangladeshi census, Sabujbag Thana had 66,456 households and a population of 258,518. 8.21% of the population were under 5 years of age. Sabujbag had a literacy rate (age 7 and over) of 86.46%: 87.52% for males and 85.29% for females, and a sex ratio of 109.96 males for every 100 females.

According to the 2011 Census of Bangladesh, it had a population of 376,421 with an average household size of 4.2 members, and an

average literacy rate of 70.2% compared to the national average of 51.8%.

== Education ==
Schools and Colleges in Sabujbagh

- Sabujbagh Government College
- Sabujbagh Government High School
- Basaboo Boys' and Girls' High School
- Motijheel Model High School and College, Basabo Branch
- Kadamtala Purbo Basaboo High School and college,
- Madartek Abdul Aziz School and College,
- Kamalapur School and College,
- Central Ideal School And College
- Mugda Para Kazi Zafor Ahmed High School
- Ideal School and College, Mugdapara Branch,
- Dharmarajika Orphanage Residential High School
- Moon Light Kinder Garten
- Desh Ideal School and College

== See also ==
- Thanas of Bangladesh
