= Kamalapur Dharmarajika Bauddha Vihara =

Buddhist monastery in Bangladesh

Dharmarajika Buddhist Monastery Complex
- ধর্মরাজিক বৌদ্ধবিহার কমপ্লেক্স
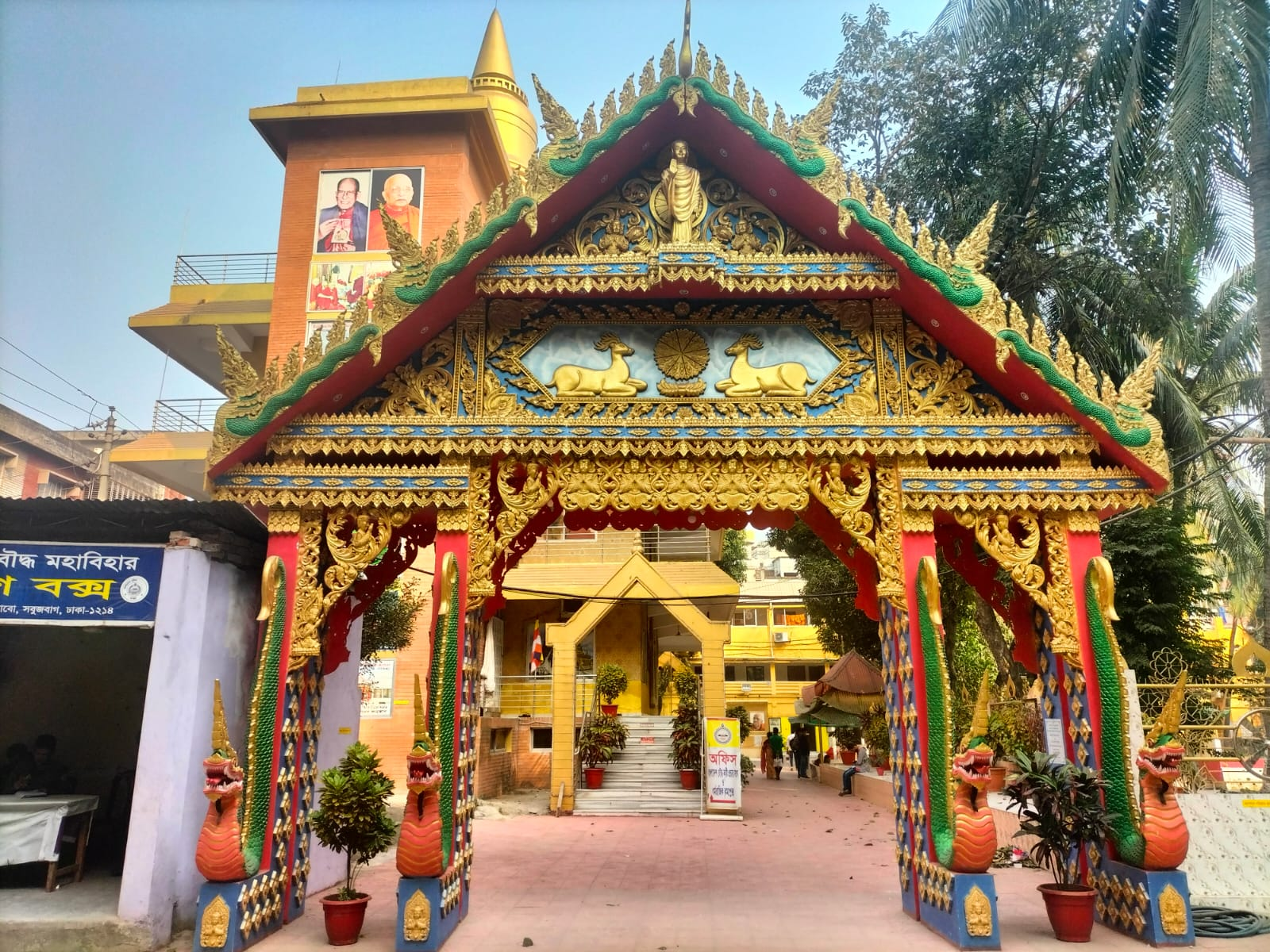

- Location within Bangladesh

Religion
- Affiliation: Buddhism
- Sect: Theravada Buddhism
- Region: Dhaka
- Deity: Buddha
- Status: Active

Location
- Location: Basabo Madartek Road
- Country: Bangladesh
- Coordinates: 23.7363639°N 90.4273901°E

Architecture
- Completed: 1960; 66 years ago

Dharmarajika Buddhist Monastery Complex (Bengali: ধর্মরাজিক বৌদ্ধবিহার কমপ্লেক্স) is a Buddhist monastery (vihara) located in the city of Dhaka in Bangladesh. It holds the distinction of being the first Buddhist monastery built in the city of Dhaka.

== History ==
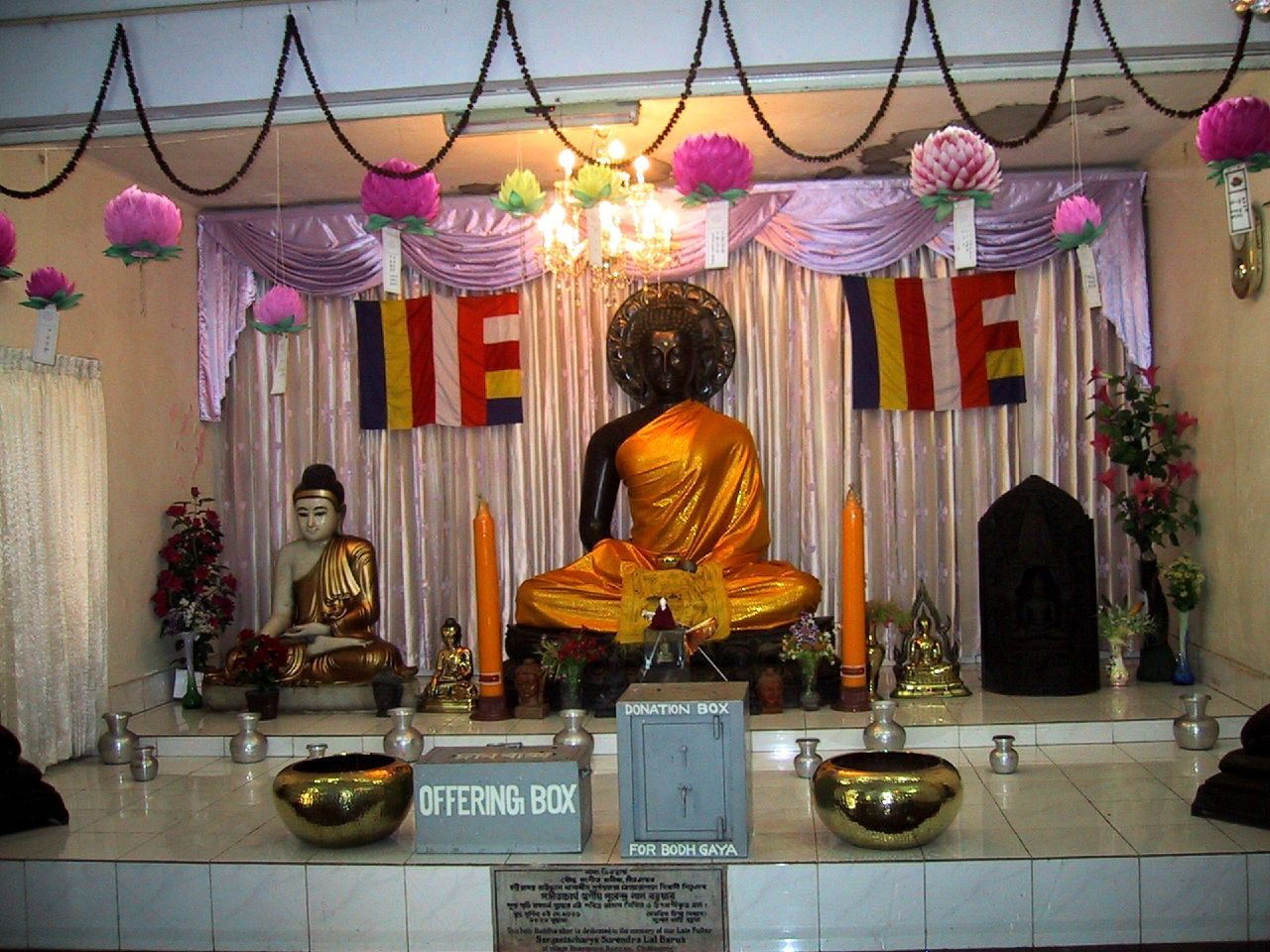
Main Shrine of Dharmarajika Buddhist Monastery

The Dharmarajika Buddhist Monastery Complex, founded by Bishuddhananda Mahathera in 1960 on a land of 4.5 acres (1.8 ha). The temple, situated in Basabo and belonging to the order of the Mahasthabir Nikaya, serves as a focal point for Buddhist life and culture in Dhaka and Bangladesh.

Within its premises lies the Dharmarajik Pali College, established in the same year. Notably, in 1962, King Bhumibol of Thailand became the first foreign head of state to visit the temple. Thailand's donation of a 10-foot tall Buddha statue in 1984 was followed by another statue gifted by Japan.

During the Bangladesh Liberation War, the temple provided shelter and later, the Dharmarajik Orphanage was established post-independence. In 1972, Dharmarajika High School was founded, followed by the establishment of Dharmarajika Technical School and Dharmarajika Kindergarten in 1993. The Dharmarajika Fine Arts Academy was set up in 1995, alongside the creation of Dharmarajika Nikkiuniyano Clinic, Dharmarajika Literary Society, and further expansion of the Dharmarajika Orphanage and establishment of Dharmarajik International Prayer Hall in 1996.
