= Junk Yard Family =

Sculpture made by Mrinal Haque

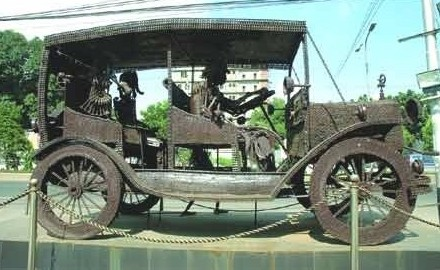
- Artist: Mrinal Haque
- Year: 2004
- Completion date: 2004
- Medium: Cast iron & metal chain
- Subject: 18th century car
- Location: Tejgaon Industrial Area Thana, Dhaka; 23.766777°N 90.400768°E
- Owner: Southern Automobile

Junk Yard Family is a 2004 cast iron and chain sculpture created by Mrinal Haque. It stands on the pier at the entrance to a gas station in Tejgaon since 2004. The sculpture was officially inaugurated on the first week of 2005. It is a private sculpture, Haque made for Southern Automobile gas station.

== Description ==
The sculpture is depiction of an 18th-century car. There is a family of four persons riding the car. A man is driving. Another kid is standing beside the rear right wheel. Try to sale some sweetener.

Scarps of bulldozers, tractors, cranes as well as chains from rickshaws and motor cycles were collected from different places, including Dholai Khal in the Dhaka city to erect the sculpture. It took 5 laks Bangladeshi Taka for creating and complete set up in 2004.
