= Kotowal (sculpture) =

Sculpture made by Mrinal Haque

- কোতোয়াল (Bengali)
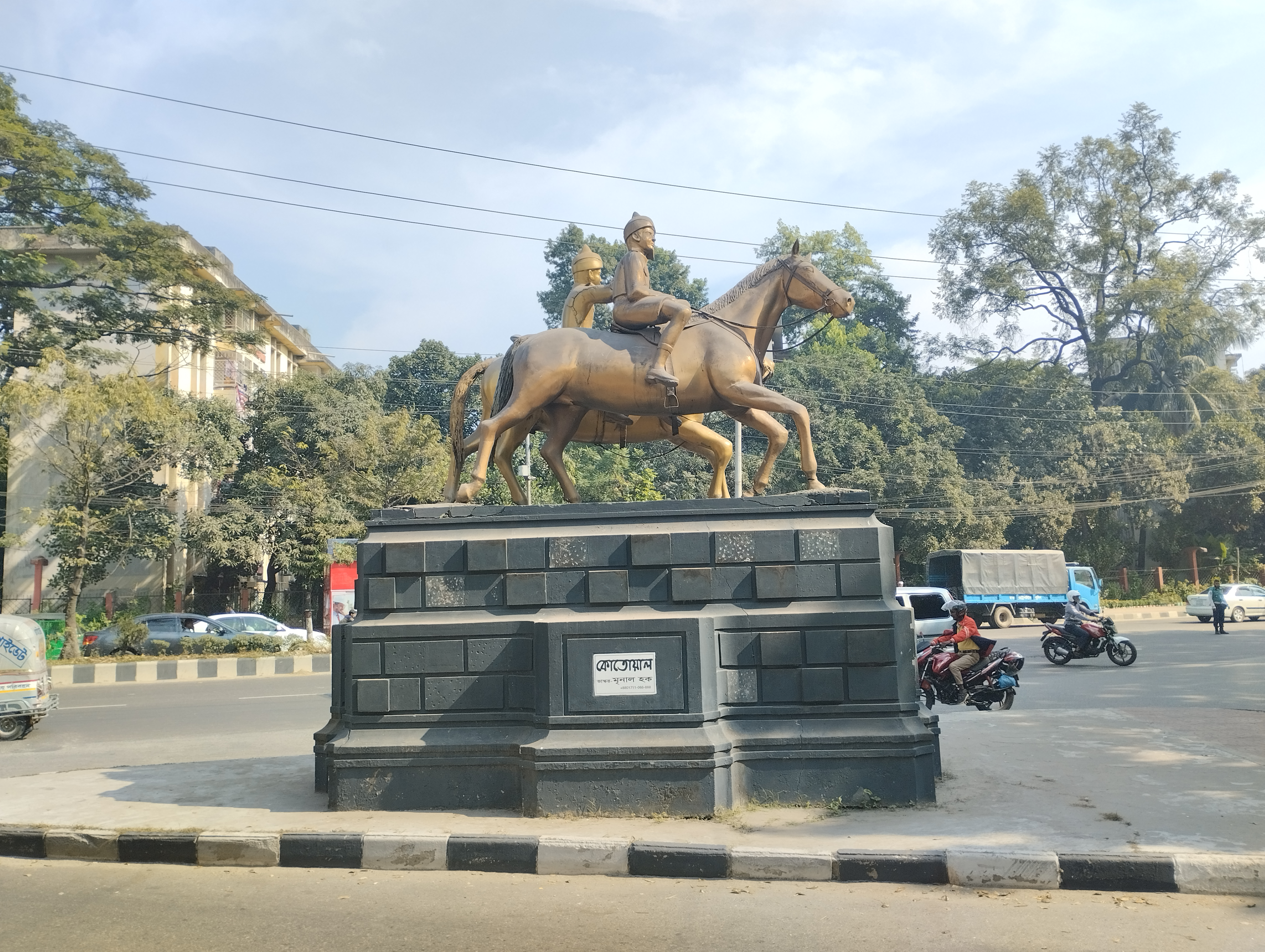
- Artist: Mrinal Haque
- Subject: Kotwal
- Location: Dhaka; 23.744182°N 90.404929°E
- Owner: Dhaka City Corporation

Kotowal is a sculpture of two horsemen on patrol made by Mrinal Haque. It is located in front of the Commissioner of Police's office at road island at the eastern end of Minto Road in Iskaton, Dhaka. The predecessors of the police system in Bangladesh was the law enforcers of the Mughal and British era were called 'Kotowal'. At that time Kotowals used to perform their duties on horseback. The sculpture commemorates and depicts the ancient tradition of law enforcement in Bangladesh.

== Description ==
The Kotwal sculpture depicts two horses draped in gold on a raised platform and two Kotwals on horseback in uniforms patrolling. The sculpture shows a Kotwal sitting on a horse with a strong whip in hand. Two Kotwals riding horses side by side. The person on the right is looking to the right and the person on the left is looking ahead.
