= Nazimuddin Road =

Road in Dhaka, Bangladesh

- Namesake: Khawaja Nazimuddin
- Type: Street
- Maintained by: Dhaka South City Corporation
- Length: 1.1 km (0.68 mi)
- Location: Dhaka
- Postal code: 1211
- South end: Chawkbazar Square
- North end: Chankharpul interchange

Nazimuddin Road (Bengali: নাজিমউদ্দিন রোড; romanised: Najimuddin rod) is a historically important and one of the busiest road in Old Dhaka, Bangladesh. It links several key areas in the capital and is especially noted for private businesses as well as hosting the city's central prison in the past. The road is named after Khawaja Nazimuddin, a significant political figure in the Indian subcontinent and the second Prime Minister of Pakistan.

== Location and structure ==
Nazimuddin Road is located in the Old Dhaka area, in proximity to major neighborhoods such as Bakshibazar, Chawkbazar, Lalbagh, and Azimpur. It lies west of the Dhaka Medical College Hospital and runs close to Jagannath University and the Lalbagh Fort, a Mughal-era structure.

== Historical significance ==
Khawaja Nazimuddin, after whom the road is named, was a nobleman of Dhaka Nawab Family, former Chief Minister of Bengal, Governor-General, and Prime Minister of Pakistan. Naming the road after him reflects his political legacy.

The Old Dhaka Central Jail, located on Nazimuddin Road, was frequently used to detain political prisoners during the Language Movement (1952), the Six-Point Movement, and the Liberation War of 1971

On November 3, 1975, four senior Awami League leaders—Syed Nazrul Islam, Tajuddin Ahmad, M. Mansur Ali, and A. H. M. Qamaruzzaman—were brutally murdered inside Dhaka Central Jail during a coup and counter-coup sequence that followed the assassination of Sheikh Mujibur Rahman on August 15, 1975. This came to be known as the Jail Killing.

== Dhaka Central Jail (Old Jail) ==
One of the most iconic features of Nazimuddin Road was the Dhaka Central Jail. Built during the British colonial period, this facility served as a high-security prison until it was officially closed in 2016, after which a new jail complex was opened in Keraniganj. The old premises are now being developed into a heritage museum to preserve the prison's long historical importance.

== Nearby important institutions ==
- Bangladesh Fire Service HQ
- Bangladesh Bar Council building
- Dhaka Education Board (Bakshibazar)

== Recent developments ==
In 2016, after the relocation of the Dhaka Central Jail, there were discussions to turn the former prison into a national museum, highlighting Bangladesh's prison and political history.

The government has initiated a "Jail Museum Project" (the Bangladesh Army and the prison department and some private companies implementing the project), preserving the gallows, historical documents, and cells once occupied by important prisoners, but locals were not agree with the decision.

== Traffic and public access ==
Normally, it is a moderately busy road serving local commuters, but because of its narrow structure and aged surroundings, it suffers from traffic congestion, especially during peak hours. Because it is connected to importance commercial places its road is widely use by suppliers and sellers.

== Notable events ==
- Trial of War Criminals (2010s) under the International Crimes Tribunal.
- In April 2025, a fire erupted around 4:10 AM on the ground floor of a five‑storey building on Nazimuddin Road near Makokrosha mazar, in the Bangshal area of Old Dhaka. The incident originated in a furniture shop, and was brought under control after nearly an hour by firefighters from Siddique Bazar and Lalbagh stations.

The former Central Jail on Nazimuddin Road in Old Dhaka is being transformed into a cultural centre to showcase local history and tradition. The two-year project, initially launched in 2018, remains unfinished. Officials now hope to complete it next year.

== See also ==
- Old Dhaka Central Jail
- Khawaja Nazimuddin
- International Crimes Tribunal (Bangladesh)
- Old Dhaka
- Lalbagh Fort
