= Shaheed Salim Ullah Road =

Street in Dhaka, Bangladesh

- Interactive map of Shaheed Salim Ullah Road
- Native name: শহীদ সলিমউল্লাহ রোড (Bengali)
- Former name: Quaid-e-Azam Road
- Type: Street
- Maintained by: Dhaka North City Corporation
- Location: Mohammadpur Thana, Dhaka, Bangladesh
- Coordinates: 23.7611098°N 90.3635421°E
- North: Tajmahal Road
- South: Asad Avenue

Other
- Status: Active

Shaheed Salim Ullah Road is a street in Mohammadpur Thana, Dhaka. It is accessible from the junction of Asad Gate and situated near to the Town Hall bazar. It was first named Quaid-e-Azam Road after Muhammad Ali Jinnah, founder of Pakistan, which was changed to the present name in 1972 by Awami League and Chhatra League which was acknowledged by the government of Bangladesh.

It is named after Salim Ullah, a Bengali social worker lived in Mohammadpur, a Muhajir dominated area. He was a supporter of independence of Bangladesh who was killed during ethnic riots after Operation Searchlight in 25 March, 1971. However, people have confusion about the street's origin and they think that it is named after Khwaja Salimullah, Nawab of Dhaka. It was popular for Selim Kabab Ghar, a Kabab restaurant and now it is a food street. There is a playing field near the street. It is known for street foods, especially "chap-brain". Luchi, Haleem, Jhalmuri, Soup, Tea, Pickle are popular street food here.
