= Bishuddhananda Mahathera =

Bangladeshi Buddhist monk and scholar

Bishuddhananda Mahathera (1909–1994) was a Bangladeshi Buddhist monk and scholar.

== Early life ==
Mahathera was born on 23 February 1909 in Hoarapara, Raozan Upazila, Chittagong District, East Bengal, British India. He studied at Noapara High School and Mahamuni Anglo Pali School.

== Career ==
In 1925, Mahathera took his vows of monk and joined a monastic order. He vows were completed in 1930. He moved to Sri Lanka in 1934 to carryout further studies on Buddhism and earned a higher degree on Buddhism. He returned from Sri Lanka in 1937. He established a number of Buddhist temples and colleges. During the Great Bengal Famine of 1943, he worked with Maniruzzaman Islamabadi and Benimadhab Barua to provide relief to the victims of the famine. He founded an orphanage for Buddhist orphans called Agrasar Anathalay.

The Government of Pakistan placed Mahathera in the Buddhist scholarship committee. He established the Bangladesh Bauddha Kristi Prachar Sangha in 1949. He successfully campaigned for including the reading of Tripitaka on public radio. He was awarded Tamgha-e-Pakistan by the Government of Pakistan. He also received the Gandhi Peace Prize. During the Bangladesh Liberation war, he arranged special cards for the Buddhist community that ensured their safety in the conflict. He renounced Tamgha-e-Pakistan award given to him by the Pakistan government.

== Death ==
Mahathere died on 2 March 1994 in Chittagong District, Bangladesh. He was buried in Hoarapara, Raozan Upazila, Chittagong at the Sudarshan Vihar.
