= Mrinal Haque =

Bangladeshi sculptor (1958–2020)

- মৃনাল হক
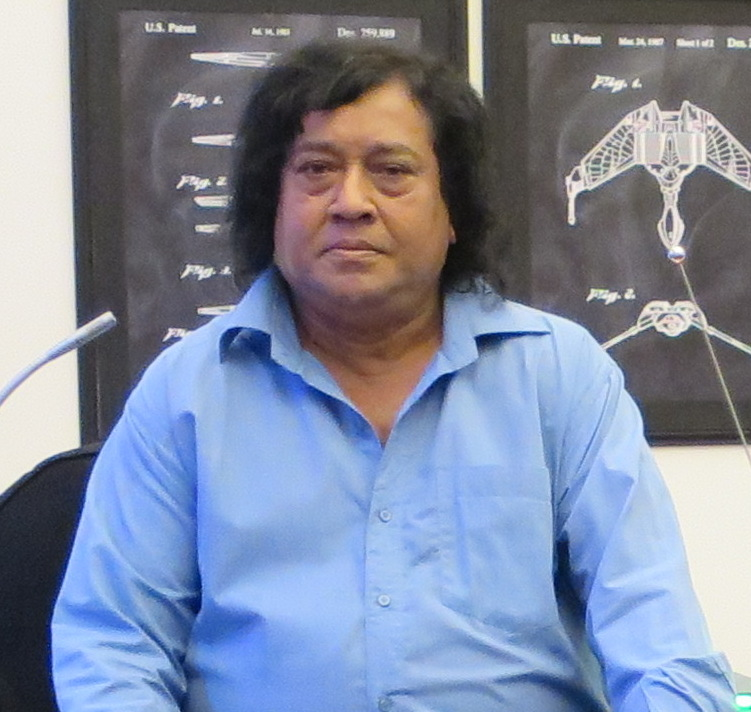
- Born: September 9, 1958; Rajshahi, Bangladesh
- Died: August 22, 2020 (aged 61); Dhaka, Bangladesh
- Resting place: Dhaka
- Known for: Sculpture

Mrinal Haque (September 9, 1958 – August 22, 2020) was a Bangladeshi sculptor. Appointed by the Government of Bangladesh, best known for having created murals on the city streets of Dhaka, the capital of Bangladesh.

== Education ==
Born in Rajshahi, Bangladesh, after receiving education from Rajshahi Government Laboratory High School and Rajshahi Cadet College, he joined the artworld in 1977 and received his BA from The Fine Arts Institute of Dhaka University. He worked primarily with clay, marble, plaster, cement, bronze, copper, terracotta, and wood. He created over 36,000 sq. ft. of work in mosaic painting. During his student years he was associated with the BNP's student wing Jatiotabadi Chhatro Dol, a time in which he was accused of terrorizing Awami League supporters. His father, professor Ekramul Haque, was an advisor to President Ziaur Rahman. He also served as the secretary of BNP's cultural wing.

== Career ==
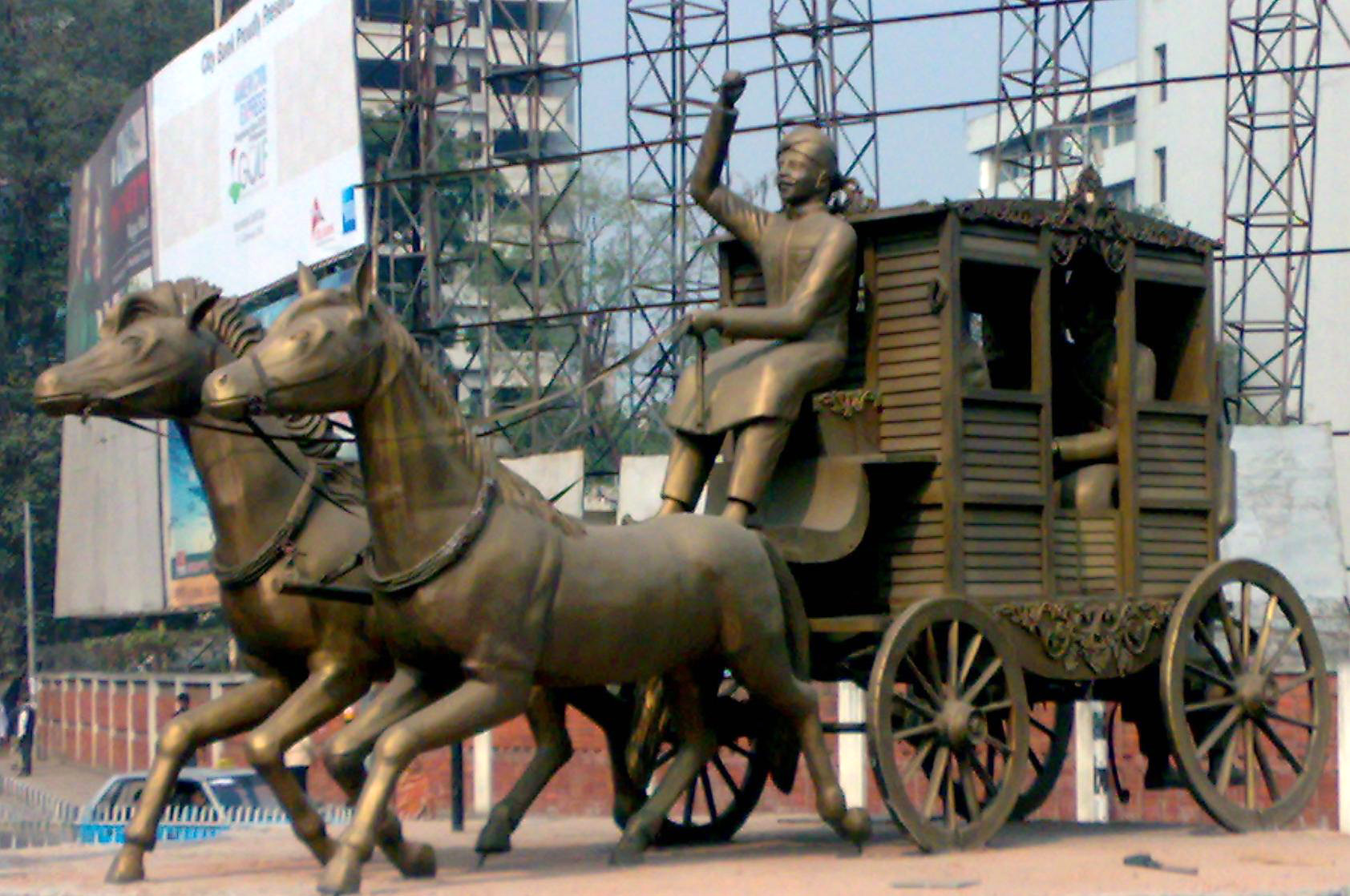
The Rajosik Bihar, a sculpture by Mrinal Haque, in front of the InterContinental Dhaka, at Minto road, in Dhaka.

Haque's exhibition held at the Consulate of Bangladesh in New York City celebrated the 28th anniversary of Independence of Bangladesh and its theme was that of the Liberation War.

Haque's sculpture, mosaic paintings, and murals can be seen in several notable locations such as the gardens and in the streets of Jackson Heights in Queens, NY. The New York City Transit Authority has chosen Haque to create mosaics. His works were reported on in the media and he was interviewed by CNN.

His work has been exhibited across the globe in thirty countries. He was twice featured in the Osaka Bi-annual Art and Sculpture Exhibition in Japan and then again in France and India. He also held exhibitions in China, five solo exhibitions in Bangladesh, Singapore and Malaysia, and also he was featured on seven occasions at the Asian Bi-annual Art Exhibition. He participated in various other exhibitions, such as; 14 times at the National Art Exhibition and seven times in the National Sculpture Exhibition of Bangladesh.

== Works ==
Awarded four times in sculpture from the Fine Arts Institute of Bangladesh, his notable works include:

- 500 ft x 5 ft mosaic tile Mural at the entrance of the Zia International Airport in Dhaka, which portrays industrial, cultural and agricultural life of Bangladesh.
- 450 ft x 30 ft mosaic painting at the V.V.I.P terminal of Zia International Airport, Dhaka where foreign dignitaries are given guard of honor and red carpet reception facing the painting
- 41 ft high sculpture of six Crane Birds stands at the heart of the capital of Bangladesh. This piece is the tallest in the country.
- 30 ft x 10 ft mural & 8 ft high sculpture at the Bangladesh Rifles Headquarters main entrance.
- 100 ft x 100 ft mosaic painting on the history of the Bangladesh Liberation War.
- 14 ft high 6 sculptures of Freedom fighters at the Police Headquarters in Bangladesh.
- 20 ft sculpture of giraffe and other animals in Rajshahi Park in Bangladesh and all the sculpture and dioramas at the National Museum in Dhaka
- 3 large Murals in Rajshahi Airport.
- 100 ft x 100 ft mosaic painting at the residence of the Ambassador of the Kingdom of Saudi Arabia.
- Mural and portrait of Melvin Jones at Lions headquarters in Dhaka.
- Sculpture of Two horsemen patrolling named Kotowal in front of Commissioner of Police's office at road island at the eastern end of Mintu Road in Iskaton, Dhaka.
- Rajosik Bihar a sculpture at Paribagh, Dhaka.
- Junk Yard Family a sculpture of 18th century car made of chains and cast iron at Tejgaon, Dhaka.

He was also creating a 3 ft x 3 ft symbol of New York City, to be placed in Battery Park, New York City. The primary foundation of this symbol is clay, which will be covered by gold sheet.

== Gallery ==
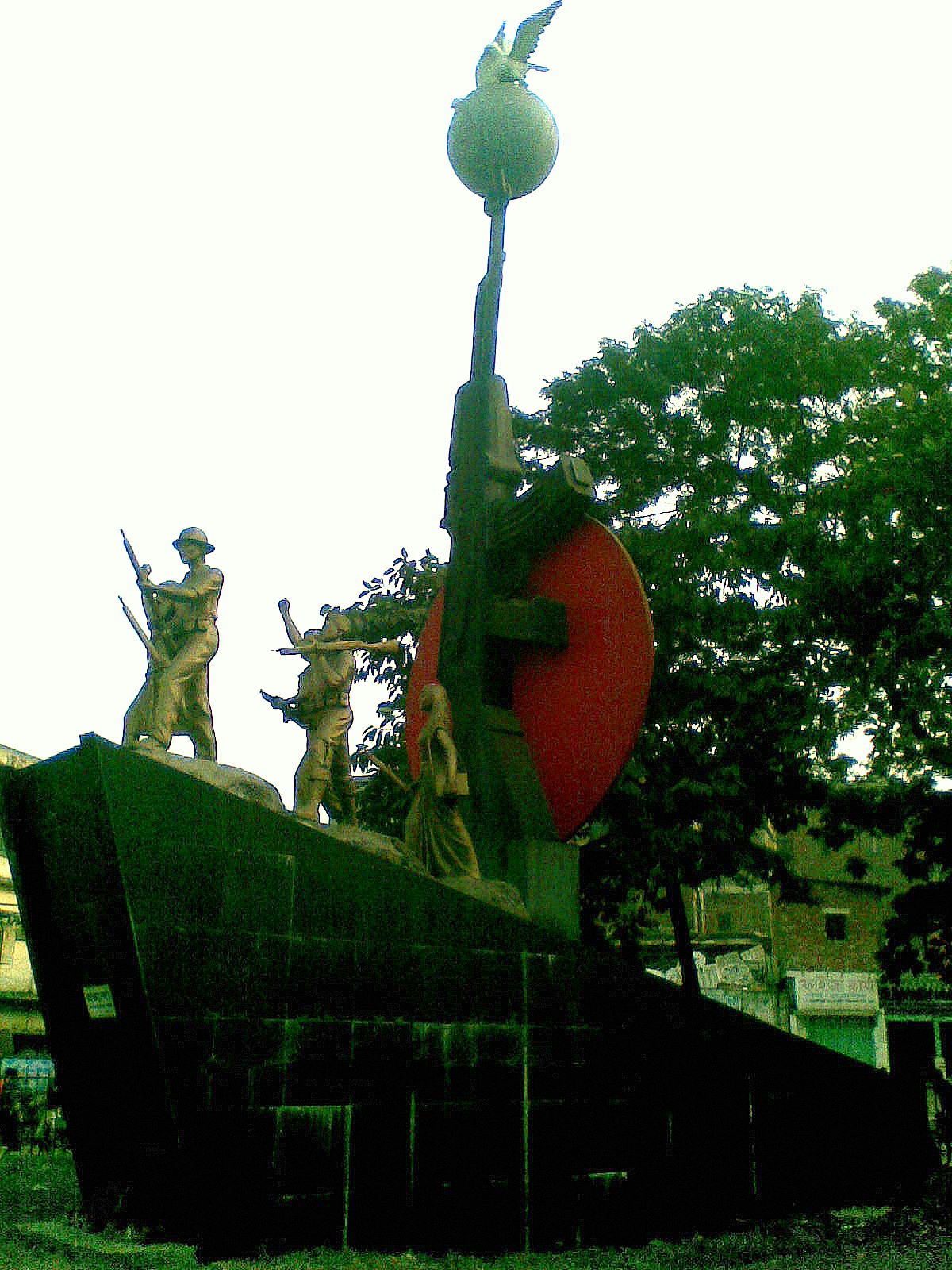
Sculpture by Haque depicted the Bangladesh Liberation War.

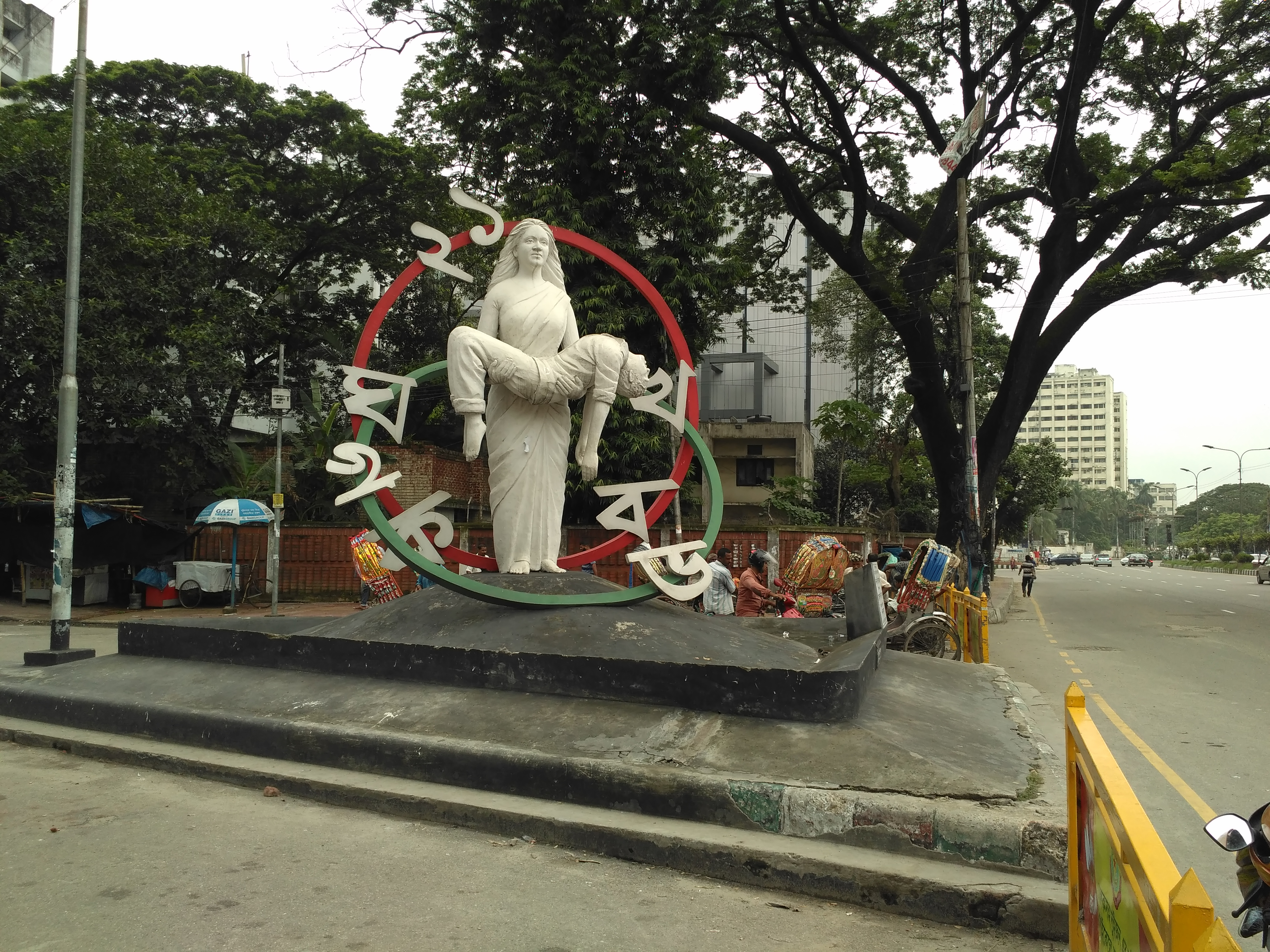
Sculpture " Janani o Gorbito Bornomala" by Haque near BTCL building, Shahbagh, Dhaka.

== Death ==
Haque was suffering from various ailments including diabetes. He had been undergoing treatment at the Evercare Hospital Dhaka for several days. Haque was taken to the hospital on August 21, 2020, due to low sugar and oxygen levels and pronounced dead by doctors. He died at around 2.30 pm. He was 61 years old .
