= Mahasthabir Nikaya =

Mahāsthabir Nikāya (মহাস্থবির নিকায়) is a Bengali order of Buddhist monks. They were anti-reformists and anti-foreign influence who attempted to replace the movement led by Saramitra Mahasthabir ("Saramedha Mahathera" in Pali), which led to the formation of the Sangharaj Nikaya in 1864.

The anti-reformation movement came into being in order to counter-act that which was led by Saramitra Mahasthabir. This movement became known as the Mahasthabir Nikaya and was led by Radha Charan Mahasthabir, the Bengali monk who first invited Saramitra Mahasthabir to Bangladesh.

However, the Mahasthabir did not oppose the Sangharaj on doctrinal grounds - they did not advocate the practices the Sangharaj Nikaya attempted to eradicate. They are doctrinally identical to the Sangharaj Nikaya. The Mahasthabir Nikaya believed that a Bengali Buddhist order should not come under a powerful influence from a foreign entity. They opposed the Sangharaj Nikaya on the grounds that the Sangharaj Nikaya was foreign in origin, not on the grounds that the Sangharaj Nikaya was degenerate. Differences between the lineages are purely practical, i.e., they advocate different day-to-day practices for their monks. As such, differences are extremely minimal, and important only to the monastic sangha. Laity following the different traditions did not particularly differentiate between the two. The distinction served only to maintain an organizational front, not a doctrinal opposition.

== See also ==
- Theravāda Buddhism
- Bengali Buddhists
- Sangharaj Nikaya
