= Bengali Buddhists =

Religious subgroup of the Bengalis

Bengali Buddhists বাঙালি বৌদ্ধ Bangali Bouddho
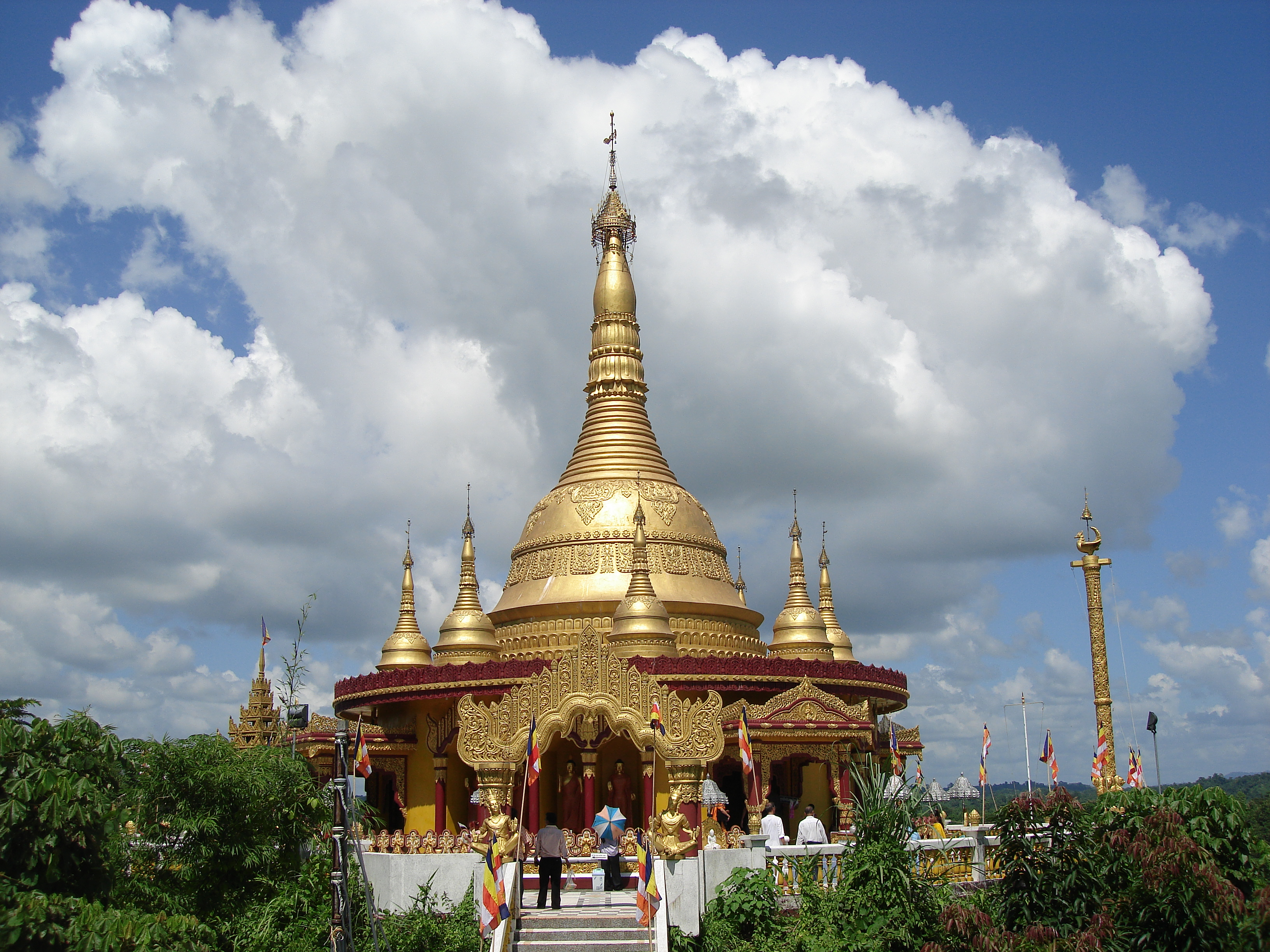
- Buddha Dhatu Zadi, a Buddhist temple in Bangladesh

Total population
- 1,290,366

Regions with significant populations
- Bangladesh: 1,007,468 (Bangladesh Census 2022)
- India (West Bengal): 282,898
- India (Tripura): 125,182

Religions
- Buddhism (Theravada Buddhism)

Languages
- Bengali

Bengali Buddhists (Bengali: বাঙালি বৌদ্ধ) are a religious sub-group of the Bengalis who adhere to or practice the religion of Buddhism. Bengali Buddhist people mainly live in the Bangladesh and Indian states of West Bengal and Tripura.

Buddhism has a rich ancient heritage in Bengal. The region was a bastion of the ancient Buddhist Mauryan and Pala empires when the Mahayana and Vajrayana schools flourished. South-eastern Bengal was ruled by the medieval Buddhist Kingdom of Mrauk U during the 16th and 17th centuries. The British Raj influenced the emergence of the modern community.

Today, the majority of the Bengali Buddhists are followers of Theravāda Buddhism.

== History ==
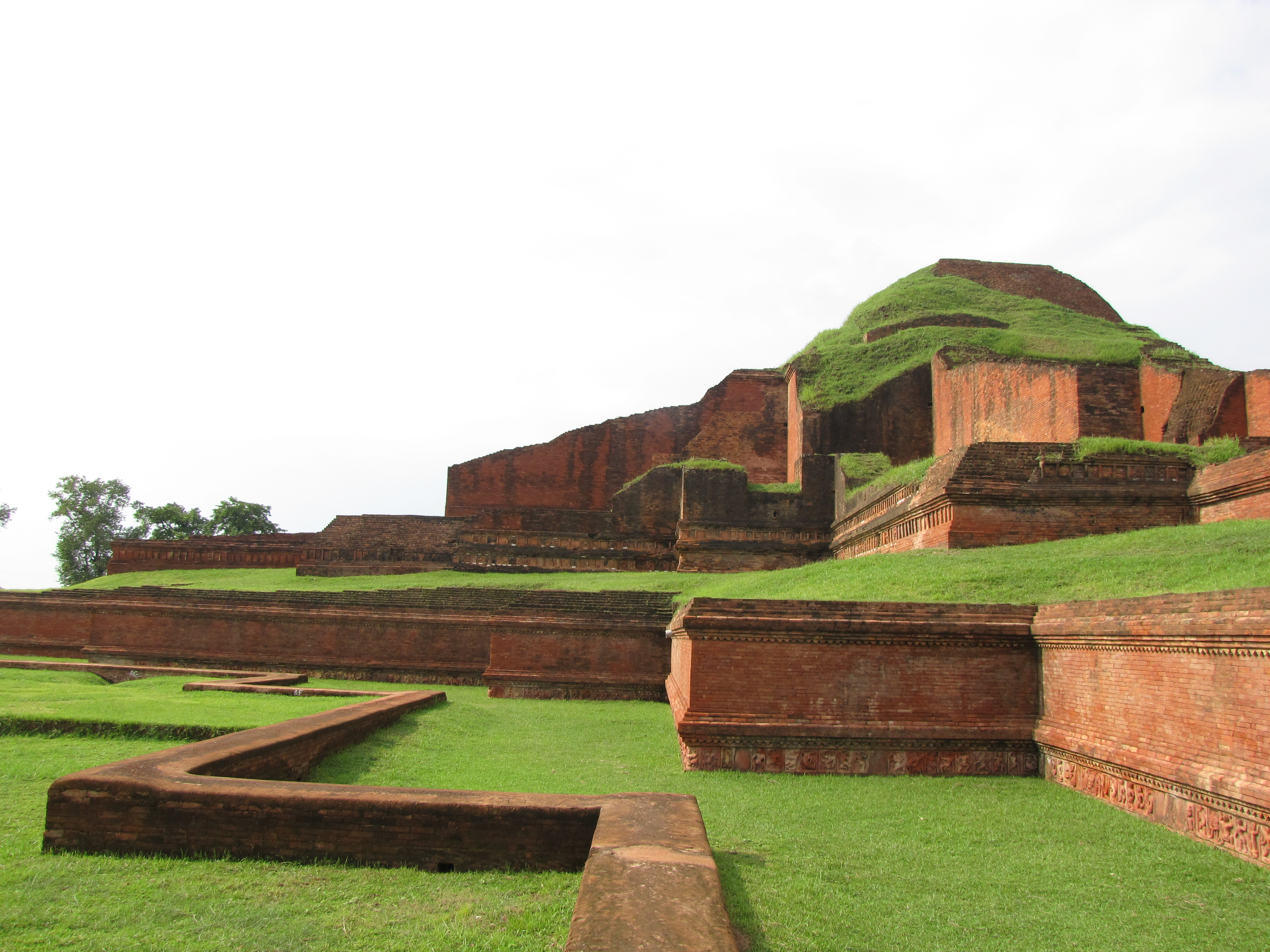
Somapura Mahavihara from the Pala dynasty, a UNESCO World Heritage Site

Ancient Bengal was a center of Buddhist learning and art. Buddhist artefacts have been excavated throughout the region, particularly in Wari-Bateshwar, Chandraketugarh, Paharpur, Mahasthangarh and Mainamati. The Mauryan Empire led by Ashoka extended its suzerainty to the region in the 2nd century BCE. Ashoka played an important role in propagating Buddhism in his own empire and the wider ancient world. Mauryan rule was succeeded by the Buddhist Samatata maritime kingdom in Bengal.

Successive Buddhist powers tussled for dominance with Hindu and Jain kings in the Indian subcontinent. Buddhism in Bengal experienced a revival under the Pala-Candra rulers. These rulers, who were Mahayana Buddhists, supported Buddhism vigorously and established renowned centers of Buddhist learning in eastern India. The Bengali Buddhist Pala Empire arose during the 8th century. Founded by the election of a Buddhist chieftain Gopala circa 750 CE, the empire grew into one of the largest imperial powers in classical Asia. The Palas promoted Mahayana and Tantric Buddhism. They patronised the creation of many outstanding temples, monasteries, and works of art. The Palas enjoyed strong relations with the Abbasid Caliphate, the Tibetan Empire and the Srivijaya Empire. The empire reached its peak under Dharmapala and Devapala. They reigned for four centuries until being replaced by the resurgent Hindu Sena dynasty. According to Kunal Chakrabarty, Buddhism in Bengal declined due to loss of distinctiveness and lack of royal patronage, as the Senas imposed a new socio-religious order, leading to the decline. According to Muhammad Ghulam Rasul, Brahmin persecution played a key role in the decline of Buddhism in India; followed by later Muslim conquest. During Sena rule in Bengal many Buddhists migrated from Bengal proper to eastern Bengal crossing Meghna River due to persecution by the Hindus.

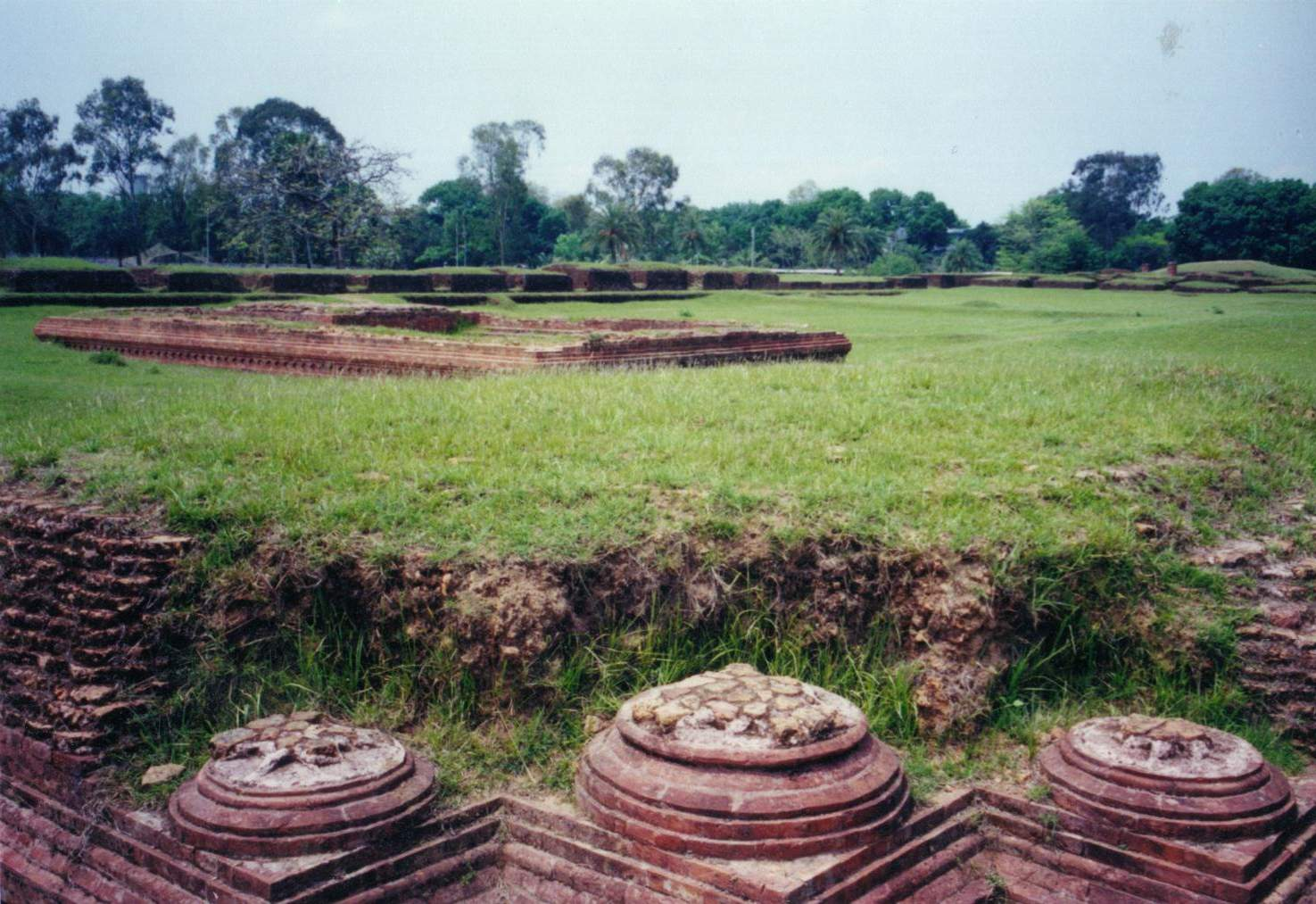
The Mainamati Buddhist ruins in southeastern Bangladesh

Remnants of Buddhist communities continued to flourish in south-eastern Bengal. The Buddhist Kingdom of Mrauk U ruled the region during the 16th and 17th centuries.

By the late 18th century, the region was ceded to the British Empire. During this period, a revival movement developed that led to the development of two orders of Theravada monks, the Sangharaj Nikaya and the Mahasthabir Nikaya.

== Demographics ==
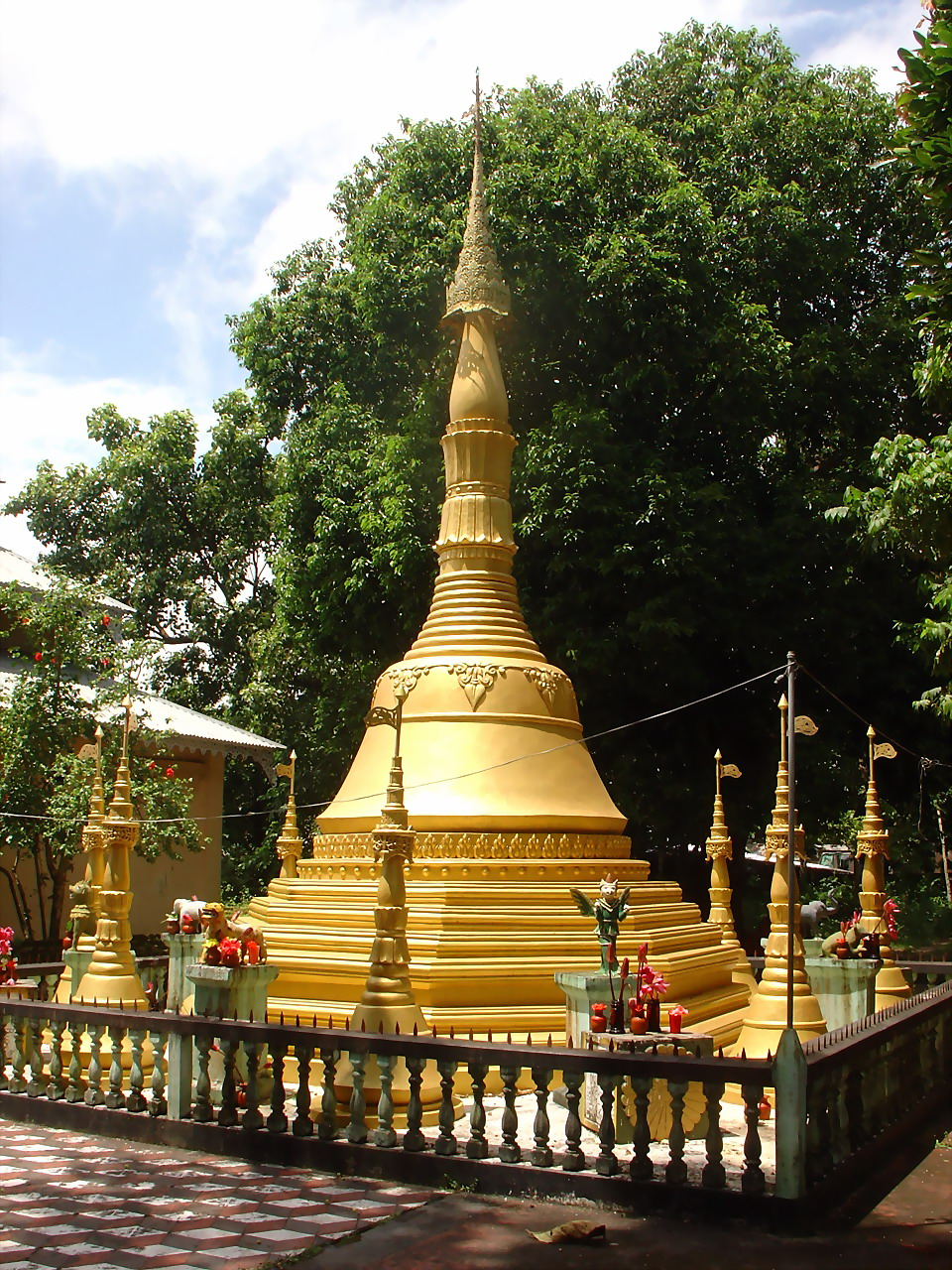
A Buddhist temple on Maheshkhali Island, Chittagong

Bangladesh is home to the predominant section of the Bengali Buddhist community. Many members of the community reside in Chittagong, Dhaka, Cox's Bazar, and Comilla. The eastern Indian state capitals of Agartala and Kolkata also have significant Bengali Buddhist communities.

Bengali Buddhists constitute 0.59% of the population in Bangladesh. According to the 2011 India census, Bengali Buddhists constitute 0.3% or 282,898 of the population in West Bengal. Buddhists constitute 3.41% or 125,182 of the population in Tripura.

== Culture ==
=== Art ===
Buddhist art flourished under the Pala rulers. The art for their period is termed Pala art. It influenced art outside of India as well. The artistic tradition continued under the Sena rulers, and thus the term "Pala-Sena" is sometimes used.

=== Festivals ===
Buddha's Birthday is a public holiday in Bangladesh & state government holiday in West Bengal.

Bengali Buddhists also celebrate the festival of Madhu Purnima. Kathin civar dana (Holy robe offering ceremony) is celebrated month-long in October–November by Bengali Buddhists.

== Notable Bengali Buddhists ==
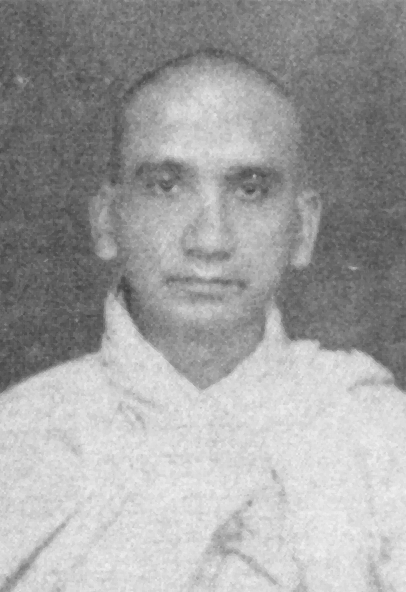
Dipankara Srijan, president of the Chittagong Buddhist Association, as leader of a delegation at the 6th Buddhist council in Rangoon.

=== Ancient period ===
- Tilopa - 10th century Buddhist Yogi, Mahasiddha, teacher of Mahamudra and main guru of Kagyu school of Vajrayana Buddhism.
- Naropa - 10th century Buddhist Yogi, Mahasiddha, teacher of Six Dharmas of Naropa and 2nd guru of mainstream Kagyu school of Vajrayana Buddhism.
- Atisa - 10th century Buddhist monk, main guru of Kadam school, prominent role in the spread of Buddhism to Tibet. Also an abbot at Vikramashila monastery.
- Chandragomin - 7th century Buddhist lay practitioner and poet from the Varendra region
- Traillokyachandra - 10th century King of the Chandra dynasty who converted to Vajrayana Buddhism

=== Modern period ===
- Shraddha Das
- Ratan Talukder, Actor and martial artist

== See also ==
- Theravāda
- Pāli Canon
- Buddhism in India
- Buddhism in Bangladesh
- Marathi Buddhists
- Kripasaran Mahathera
