= Sheikh Tamim highway =

Street in Dhaka, Bangladesh

- Interactive map of Sheikh Tamim highway
- Native name: শেখ তামিম মহাসড়ক (Bengali)
- Namesake: Tamim bin Hamad Al Thani
- Type: Street
- Maintained by: Dhaka North City Corporation
- Length: 3.7 km (2.3 mi)
- Location: Dhaka, Bangladesh
- Coordinates: 23.8230038°N 90.3781911°E
- East end: ECB Square–Jasimuddin Intersection Road
- Major junctions: ECB Square; Kalshi Junction; DOHS Mirpur Gate
- West end: Road 9

Construction
- Commissioned: 2018
- Completion: 2023

Other
- Status: Active

Sheikh Tamim highway is a street located in Dhaka, Bangladesh.

In the 2010s or earlier, a pathway was constructed through Kalshi to connect the Dhaka Cantonment with the Mirpur Cantonment. In 2018, a plan was made to construct a flyover from ECB Square to Kalshi intersection, which also included widening the existing streets located under the proposed flyover. By 2023, the widening of the 3.7 km-long pathway stretching from ECB Square through Kalshi to Mirpur DOHS was completed. On 19 February of the same year, the widened street was inaugurated along with the Kalshi flyover. On 23 April 2024, the street was named after Tamim bin Hamad Al Thani, the Emir of Qatar.
