= Love Road, Mirpur =

Street in Dhaka, Bangladesh

Love Road
- Interactive map of Love Road
- Native name: লাভ রোড (Bengali)
- Type: Street
- Maintained by: Dhaka North City Corporation
- Location: Mirpur Model Thana, Dhaka, Bangladesh
- Coordinates: 23.8043657°N 90.3600393°E
- East: Milk Vita Road
- West: Nahar Road

Other
- Status: Active

Love Road is a street situated in Mirpur Model Thana, Dhaka, Bangladesh. It is near to Sher-e-Bangla National Cricket Stadium. It is popularly known for street foods, especially to young generation of the area. It was an unnamed street in past. People usually visit there for street foods on weekends and holidays.
