= Kazi Nazrul Islam Avenue =

Road in Dhaka, Bangladesh

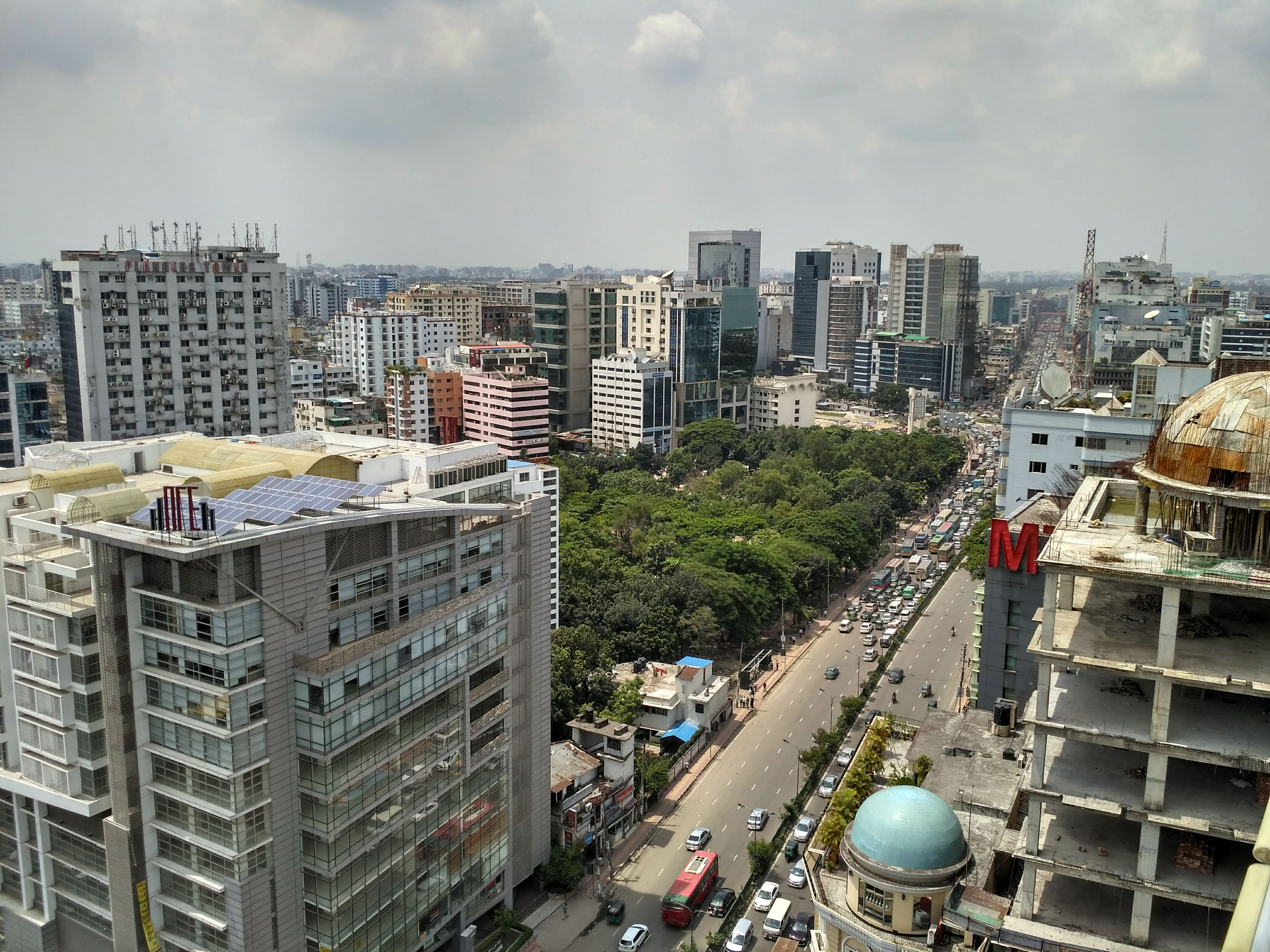
- Kazi Nazrul Islam Avenue at Banglamotor Interchange
- Former name: VIP Road
- Part of: N3
- Namesake: Kazi Nazrul Islam
- Type: Avenue
- Maintained by: Dhaka North City Corporation, Dhaka South City Corporation
- Length: 4.6 km (2.9 mi)
- Location: Dhaka
- South end: Doyel Square
- North end: Bijoy Sarani

Other
- Known for: Kazi Nazrul Islam

Kazi Nazrul Islam Avenue is a major avenue in Dhaka, the capital of Bangladesh. The avenue was formerly known as VIP Road. It starts from Doyal Square at University of Dhaka and ends at the Bijoy Sarani intersection.

== Landmarks ==
- Dhaka Gate
- Bangla Academy
- Suhrawardy Udyan
- The Mausoleum of national poet Kazi Nazrul Islam
- Anti Terrorism Raju Memorial Sculpture
- Bangladesh National Museum
- Bangladesh Medical University
- Projonmo Square
- Hotel InterContinental
- Hotel Pan-Pacific Sonargaon
- Dhaka WASA
- National Bank Limited
