= Lion Cinemas =

Movie theater in Bangladesh

- লায়ন সিনেমাস

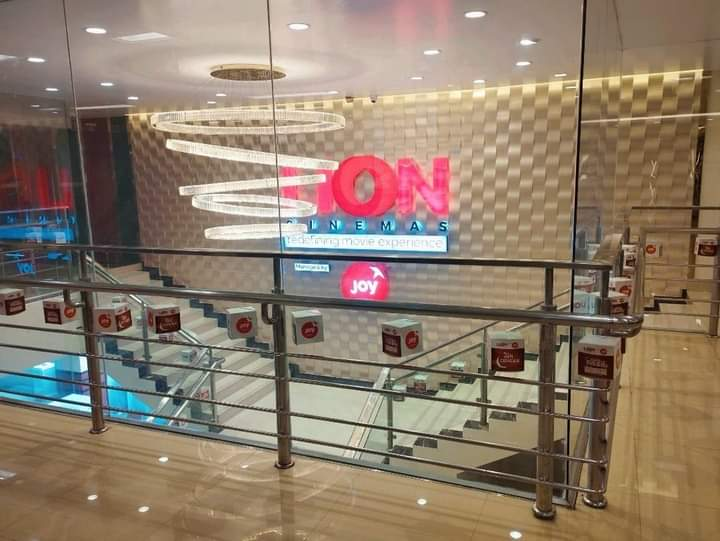
- Interactive map of Lion Cinemas
- Full name: Joy–Lion Cinemas
- Former names: Diamond Jubilee Theatre (1897–1932); Lion Theatre (1932–2005)
- Address: Keraniganj Upazila, Dhaka District; Bangladesh
- Location: Lion Shoppers World, Kadamtali Model Town
- Coordinates: 23.7030861°N 90.3975788°E
- Owner: Mirza Abdul Khaleque
- Operator: Joy Cinemas
- Capacity: 800
- Type: Multiplex
- Screen: 4

Construction
- Opened: 31 August 1897
- Closed: 2005
- Reopened: 2 May 2022

Website
- joycinemas.com

The Joy–Lion Cinemas, or simply the Lion Cinemas, is a multiplex located at Dhaka district in Bangladesh. It was reopened as a multiplex on Eid-ul-Fitr, 2022. It is one of the modern movie theaters in the country.

== History ==
=== Establishment ===
Kishorilal Roy Chowdhury, a Zamindar, built a theatre in Old Dhaka named Diamond Jubilee Theatre in 1897. Drama was performed in this theater. Later, due to the demand, only films were shown in the theater from 1927. A person named Mirza Abdul Kader bought the theatre in 1930. He changed its name to Lion Theatre in 1932. The theater could accommodate 938 spectators.

=== Recent developments ===
The next owner of the movie theater, Mirza Abdul Khaleque, closed it in 2005 due to financial losses. At that time he bought a land in Kadamtali Model Town in Keraniganj. There, in 2014, he set up a shopping mall called Lion Shoppers World. In that shopping mall, he founded Lion Cinemas multiplex. The multiplex was scheduled to open on 1 March 2018 and the date was changed to 16 December 2019. It was later inaugurated on Eid-ul-Fitr 2022.

== Features ==
The area of the multiplex is 18 thousand square feet. There are 4 screens with 200 seats, as well as a food court and a film museum. The multiplex, situated on 7th, 8th and 9th floor of the shopping mall, has total 800 seats. The authority entered into an agreement with Joy Cinemas to operate the multiplex. The two screens is reserved for foreign films. The theatre has a 3D screen also.

=== Type of cinemas ===
- Bangladeshi Films
- American Films
- Foreign films (Other than American films)

== See also ==
- Star Cineplex
- Blockbuster Cinemas
- Cinema of Bangladesh
- Azad Cinema
- Modhumita Cinema
- Modhubon Cinema
- Shyamoli Cinema
- Monihar Cinema
- CineScope
