= Blockbuster Cinemas =

Cineplex in Dhaka, Bangladesh

- ব্লকবাস্টার সিনেমাস

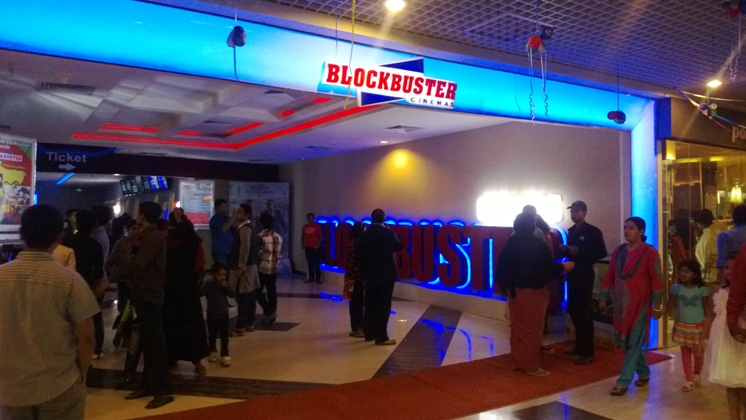
- Interactive map of Blockbuster Cinemas
- Address: Jamuna Future Park; Dhaka; Bangladesh
- Coordinates: 23.8135242°N 90.4236755°E
- Owner: Jamuna Group
- Capacity: 1880
- Type: Multiplex
- Screen: 7

Construction
- Opened: 6 September 2013

Website
- https://www.blockbusterbd.com/

The Blockbuster Cinemas is a cineplex located in Dhaka, Bangladesh. It was opened on September 6, 2013. It is the largest multiplex in the country.

== History ==
Although the multiplex was supposed to be opened on August 8, 2013, it did not happen then. Located in Jamuna Future Park, the multiplex was opened with a red carpet on 1 September 2013 and an inaugurated 5 days later. Mrittika Maya was screened at Blockbuster Cinemas on the red carpet. The multiplex was inaugurated by showing the film Oblivion.

== Features ==
75 employees work in this 1880 seat multiplex. Blockbuster Cinemas has 280 seats per screen except Club Royal. There are special arrangements for VIP viewers. It has matinee, evening and night shows.

=== Screens ===
- Irish
- Montage
- Thrill
- Exposure
- Utsob
- Transition
- Club Royal

== See also ==
- Star Cineplex
- Lion Cinemas
- Cinema of Bangladesh
- Azad Cinema
- Modhumita Cinema
- Modhubon Cinema
- Shyamoli Cinema
- Monihar Cinema
- CineScope
