= STAR Cineplex =

Bangladeshi movie theater chain

- Type: Multiplex Movie Theater
- Industry: Entertainment (movie theaters)
- Founded: 9 October 2004; 21 years ago in Dhaka, Bangladesh
- Headquarters: Dhaka
- Key people: Mahboob Rahman Ruhel (chairperson)
- Parent: Show Motion Limited
- Website: starcineplex.com

STAR Cineplex is a Bangladeshi movie theater chain. It is owned by Show Motion Limited and the Bashundhara City branch was the first of its kind in Dhaka, Bangladesh. As of September 2026, the cinema chain has a total number of 27 functional screens at 9 locations in 3 cities.

== History ==
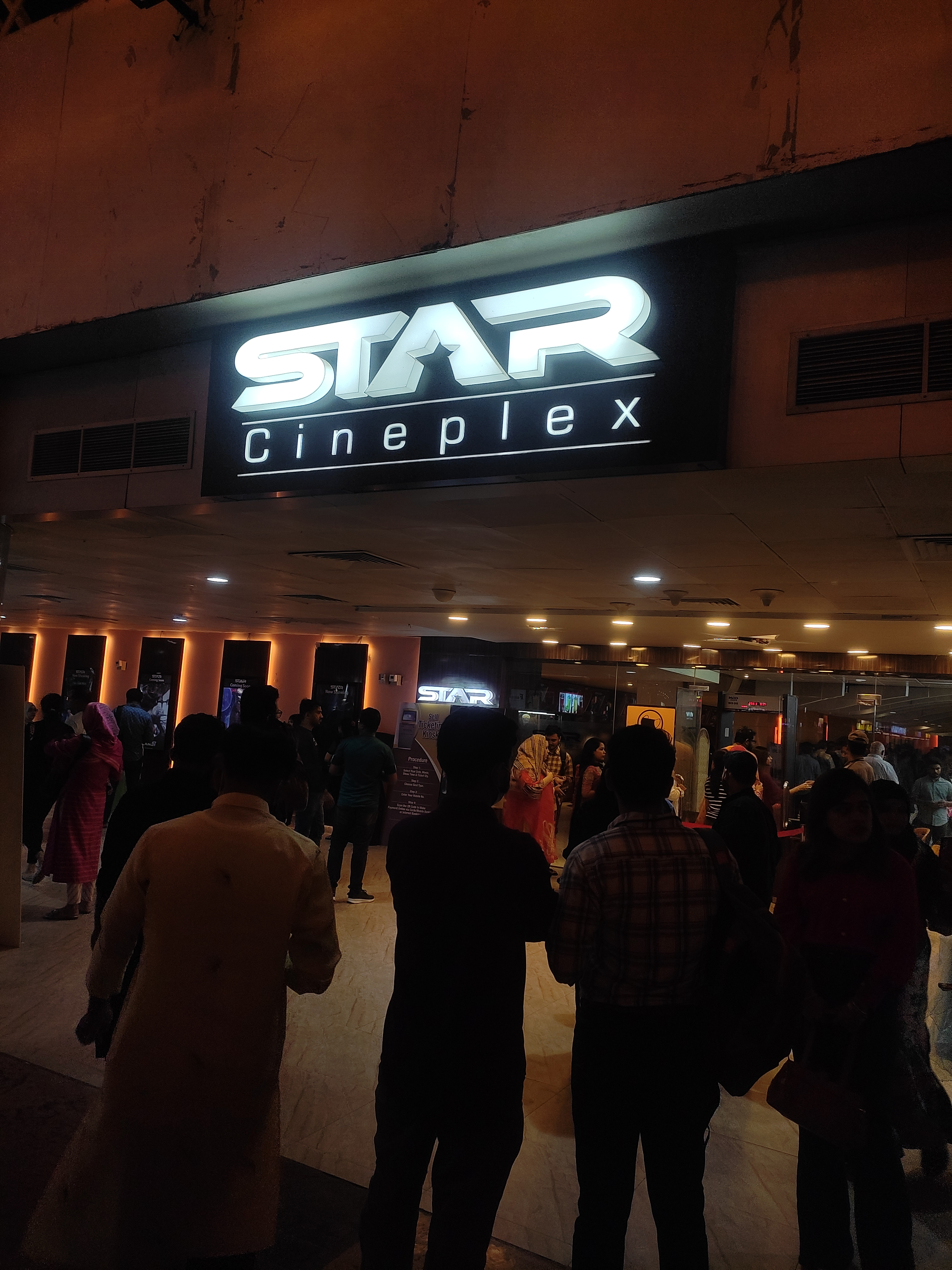
STAR Cineplex in Bashundhara City

STAR Cineplex was founded on 9 October 2004, in Bashundhara City. The branch has six fully digital cinema screens with state-of-the-art 3D Projection Technology, silver screens, Dolby-Digital sound and stadium seating. With a total capacity of approximately 1600 seats the theater has large lobby with full concession stands serving pop-corns, soft drinks, ice-creams and many other items. In January 2019, they opened their second cineplex at Shimanto Shambhar, a newly built shopping centre beside Shimanto Square. In October 2019, they opened their third cineplex at SKS Tower in Mohakhali. In August 2021, they opened their fourth cineplex in Mirpur at Sony Square. They opened their fifth cineplex at Bangladesh Military Museum in April 2022 with good sound system and a capacity of 183 seats. They opened their first branch outside Dhaka at Bali Arcade in Chittagong on 2 December 2022. They opened their second branch outside Dhaka at Hi-tech Park in Rajshahi on 13 January 2023, which following the July Uprising has remained closed indefinitely. Cineplex opened their Uttara branch at the Centrepoint mall in Eid-ul-Fitr 2025.

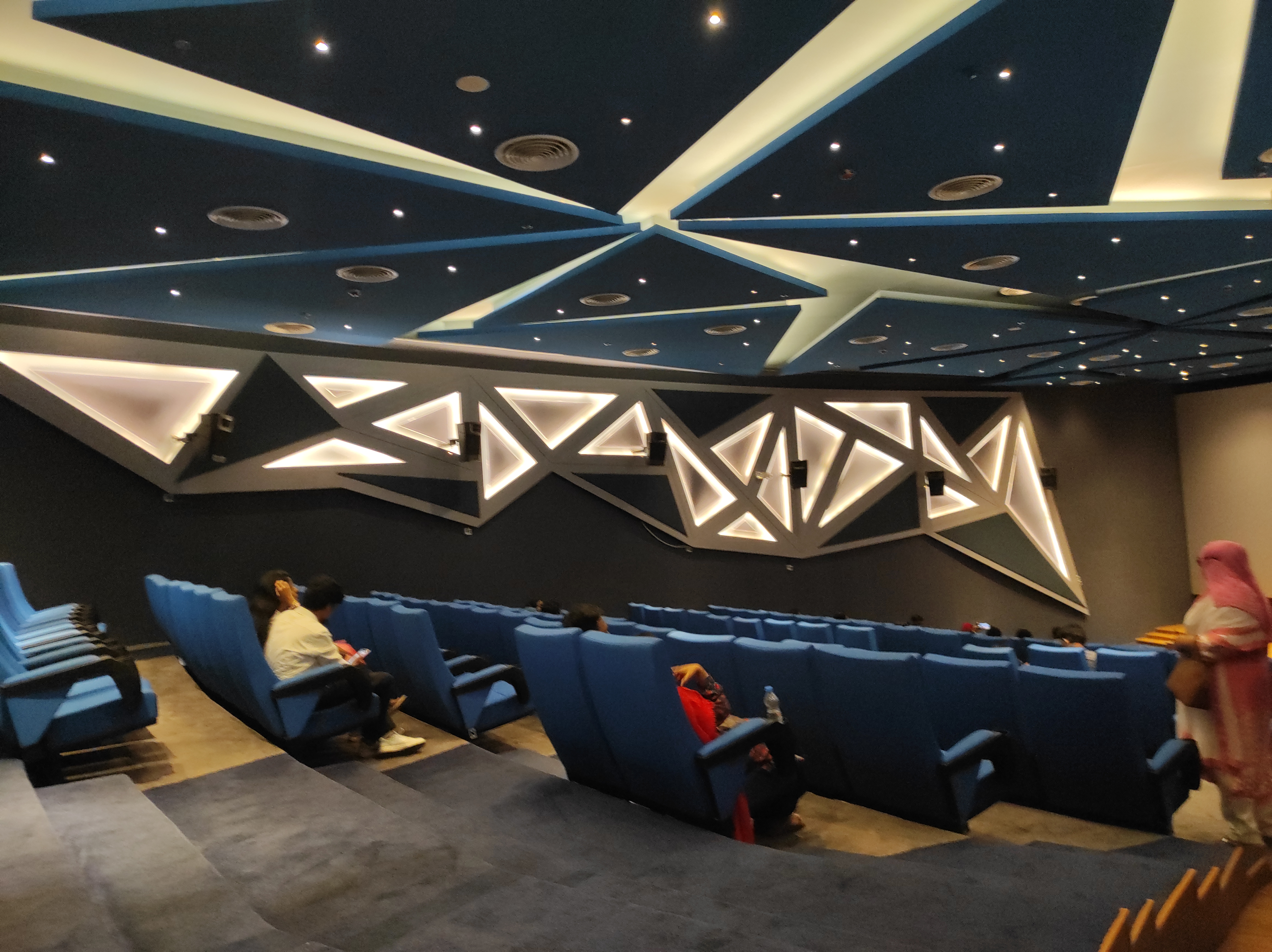
Star Cineplex Hall inside the Military Museum

== Branches ==
=== Functional ===
Dhaka

- Bashundhara Shopping Complex (6 Screens), Panthapath
- Shimanto Shambhar (3 Screens), Dhanmondi
- SKS Tower (3 Screens), Mohakhali
- Sony Square (4 Screens), Mirpur
- Bangladesh Military Museum (Single Screen), Bijoy Sarany
- Centrepoint (3 Screens), Uttara

Chattogram

- Bali Arcade (3 Screens), Chawkbazar
- Finlay Square (2 Screens), East Nasirabad

Narayanganj

- Shimanto Tower (3 Screens), Jalkuri

=== Under construction ===
Bogura

- Police Plaza (2 Screens)

=== Closed ===
Rajshahi

- Hi-Tech Park (3 Screens), Rajshahi

== Controversy ==
In August 2022, the authority was accused of not selling ticket of Poran to a senior citizen named Saman Ali Sarkar for wearing lungi at the Sony Square branch of Star Cineplex. When the whole incident went viral on the internet, there was outrage among the people and many went to Star Cineplex wearing lungi to watch films in protest. The authority apologized for the incident on August 4th and Saman was allowed to watch the film with his family that day.

== See also ==
- Blockbuster Cinemas
- Lion Cinemas
- Cinema of Bangladesh
- Azad Cinema
- Modhumita Cinema
- Modhubon Cinema
- Shyamoli Cinema
- Monihar Cinema
- CineScope
