= List of largest shopping malls in South Asia =

This is a list of largest shopping malls in South Asia, sortable by name, location, year opened and Gross Leasable Area.

| Name | Location | Country | Year | Size (Total area) | Source |
|---|---|---|---|---|---|
| Jamuna Future Park | Dhaka | Bangladesh | 2013 | 4,100,000 square feet (380,000 m^{2}) | |
| Lucky One Mall | Karachi | Pakistan | 2017 | 3,444,500 square feet (320,000 m^{2}) | |
| Emporium Mall | Lahore | Pakistan | 2016 | 2,700,000 square feet (250,000 m^{2}) | |
| Lulu International Shopping Mall | Thiruvananthapuram | India | 2021 | 2,700,000 square feet (250,000 m^{2}) | |
| Lulu International Shopping Mall | Kochi | India | 2013 | 2,500,000 square feet (230,000 m^{2}) | |
| Mall of India | Noida | India | 2016 | 2,000,000 square feet (190,000 m^{2}) | |
| Sarath City Capital Mall | Hyderabad | India | 2018 | 1,931,000 square feet (179,400 m^{2}) | |
| Lulu Mall | Lucknow | India | 2022 | 1,900,000 square feet (180,000 m^{2}) | |
| Ambience Mall | Gurgaon | India | 2007 | 1,800,000 square feet (170,000 m^{2}) | |
| The Northwalk Mall | Karachi | Pakistan | 2021 | 1,500,000 square feet (140,000 m^{2}) | |
| DB City Mall | Bhopal | India | 2010 | 1,300,000 square feet (120,000 m^{2}) | |
| Bashundhara City | Dhaka | Bangladesh | 2004 | 1,200,000 square feet (110,000 m^{2}) | |
| Centrepoint | Dhaka | Bangladesh | 2024 | 959,960 square feet (89,000 m^{2}) | |
