= Sukumari (film) =

1929 film, first to be produced in Dhaka

- Directed by: Ambuja Prasanna Gupta
- Produced by: Nawab family of Dhaka
- Starring: Khwaja Adil; Khwaja Nasrullah; Syed Abdus Sobhan
- Cinematography: Khwaja Ajmal
- Distributed by: Nawab family of Dhaka
- Release date: October 1929
- Running time: 40 minutes
- Country: British India
- Language: Silent

Sukumari (Bengali: সুকুমারী; Bengali pronunciation: [ʃukumari]; transl. The Good Girl) is a 1929 short film, the first ever made film based in Dhaka, British India (present-day Bangladesh), initiated by enthusiasts from the Nawab family of Dhaka. Inspired by their encouragement, Ambuja Prasanna Gupta directed this experimental short silent film in 1927. The actors and crew were all residents of Dhaka, and it was their first experience in filmmaking. Consequently, the producers, director, actors, and entire crew of this film are considered the pioneers of film production in Dhaka, and thus, in Bangladesh.

== Cast and crew ==
=== Casting ===
The young members of the Nawab family of Dhaka were enthusiastic about filmmaking and acting. It is known that Khwaja Zahir, Khwaja Adil, and Syed Saheb Alam from the Nawab family acted in films. Due to social and religious restrictions, women did not have the opportunity to act in films. Men had to play the roles of heroines. Nawabzada Nasrullah played the male role and Syed Abbus Sobhan, a young man, was chosen to play the female role.

=== Other crew ===
The director of the film Sukumari was Ambujprosanna Gupta, who was the sports teacher at Jagannath College, the secretary of Wari Club, and a director of my plays. He was previously acquainted with the Nawab family. The cinematography for this film was done by Khwaja Ajmal. Ambujprosanna Gupta and Khwaja Ajmal thus became the first director and cinematographer, respectively, of films made in Bangladesh.

== Production ==
=== Filming ===
The first filmmaking process started under the financial help and patronage of the Nawab family of Dhaka. The entire film was shot in the area of Dilkuusha Garden (present-day Bangabhaban), owned by the Nawab family of Dhaka. To avoid any damaging the filming reel, no scene was shot for the second time. For capturing images, reflective boards made from cigarette packet wrappers were set up during daylight.

Actress Sukumari (played by Abdus Sobhan) was walking with the end of her sari draped over her head, accompanied by her husband. At one point, either carelessly or unexpectedly, the end of the sari suddenly slipped off her head. As a result, it covered the head of a young man with short hair. Due to the lack of additional film reels, the scene was not taken again, and the camera was not turned off during the shooting... Only one print of Sukumari was made.

— Khawaja Zaheer, involved in the production of Sukumari
Source: Anupam Hayat, বাংলাদেশের চলচ্চিত্রের ইতিহাস (1987), page:10

=== Editing ===
The film was made with the encouragement and sponsorship of the Nawab family of Dhaka; it was composed of only four reels. Considering the preservation of the film, no scenes were edited out. Only one print of the film was made.

== Release ==
Only one copy of the film was made. Unfortunately the copy of the film was never available for the public screening. But there were a few private screenings.

== Legacy ==
After successfully making the film, some culturally-minded young individuals from the Nawab family of Dhaka, who were involved with the film, took the initiative to make the first film in Dhaka and established an organization called the Dhaka East Bengal Cinematograph Society, which was the first film-producing organization of Bangladesh. Through their efforts, the first full-length film based on Dhaka, The Last Kiss, was later produced, released in 1931. It was also produced by the Nawab family of Dhaka.

Only a still picture of Sukumari is preserved by Bangladesh Film Archive.
