= Unimart (disambiguation) =

Unimart is a Bangladesh hyperstore franchise.

Unimart may also refer to:

- Uni-Mart, a defunct Pennsylvania-based grocery store
- Unimart (California), a defunct California discount store
