= Sarath City Capital Mall =

Shopping mall in Hyderabad, India

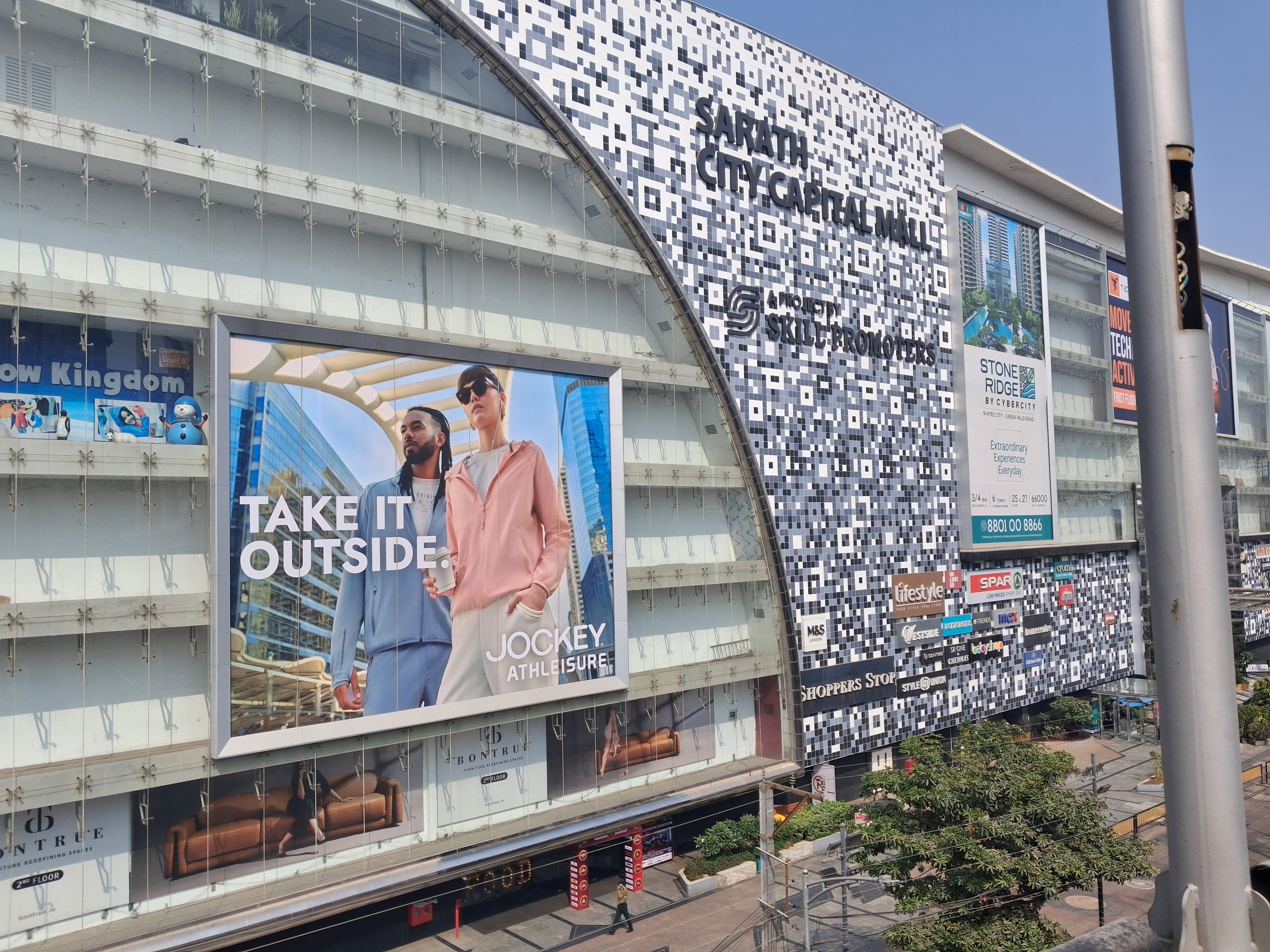
- Location: Kondapur, Hyderabad
- Coordinates: 17.457°N 78.364°E
- Address: Kondapur, Hyderabad
- Opened: 2018
- Developer: Skill Promoters Private Limited
- Manager: Skill Promoters Pvt Ltd & Dymes Engineers Pvt Ltd
- Owner: Skill Promoters Pvt Ltd & Dymes Engineers Pvt Ltd
- Num. of stores: 400
- Floor area: 2,700,000 sq ft
- Floors: 8
- Parking: Multilevel
- Website: https://sarathcitycapitalmall.com/

Sarath City Capital Mall is a shopping mall in Hyderabad, India. It is located in the Kondapur area of the city and is also one of the largest shopping malls in all of India. It is generally referred to by the locals as "AMB Mall"

The mall has a dedicated area of about 2,700,000 sq ft, meaning mall retail space of 1,931,000 sq ft, has parking spaces for over 4000 cars and over 6000 bikes and is split into 8 floors.

It has 2 food courts, a hypermarket by the Dutch brand Spar, An amusement park and Arcade by the name Tridom, a cinema multiplex called AMB Cinemas, which is a joint venture between Indian Multiplex chain Asian Cinemas and Telugu Film Actor and Indian Celebrity Mahesh Babu, a marketplace called BAZAAR, has over 500 brands in the mall for people to shop for, etc.

== Gallery ==
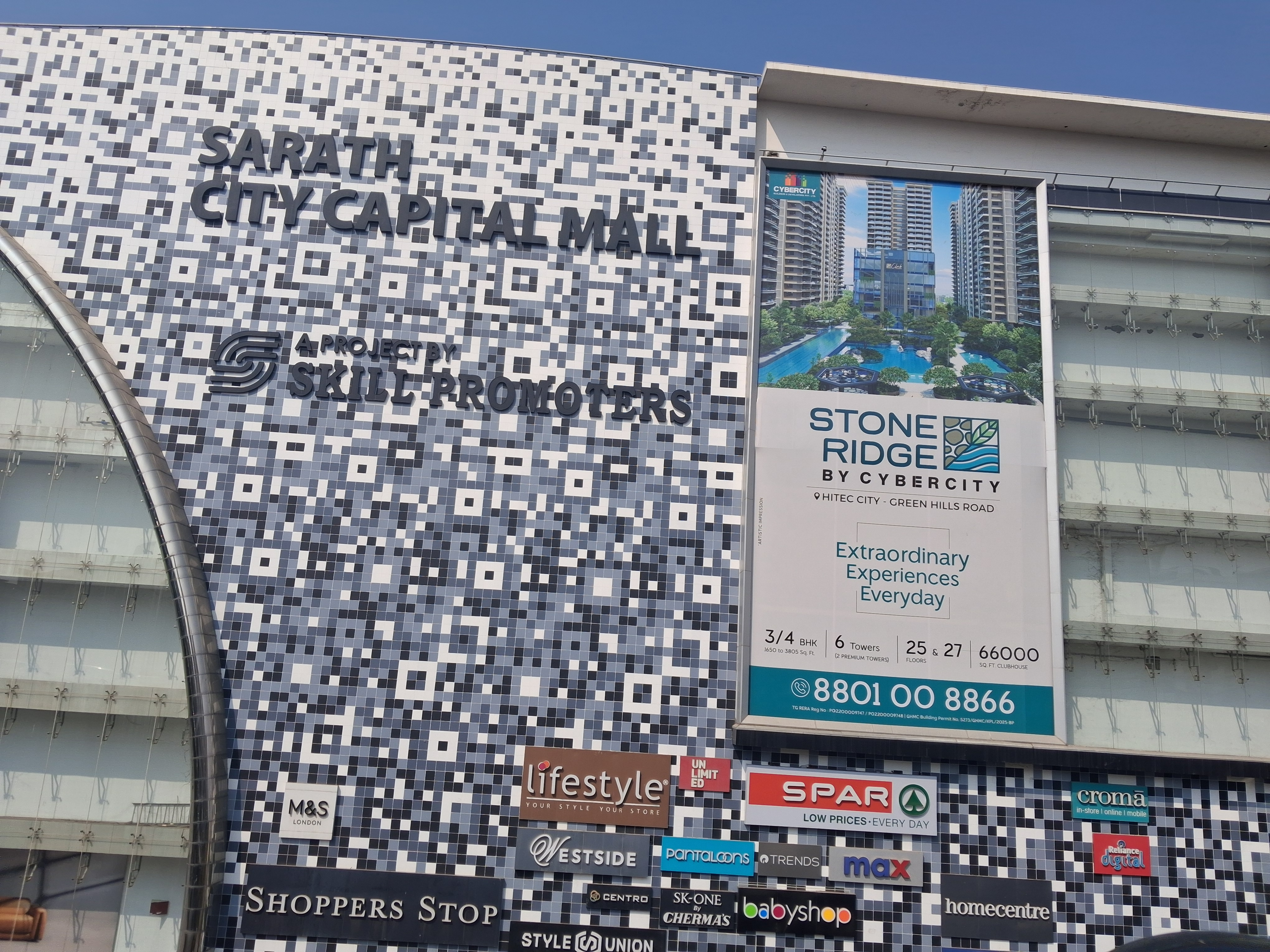
outside view of the mall

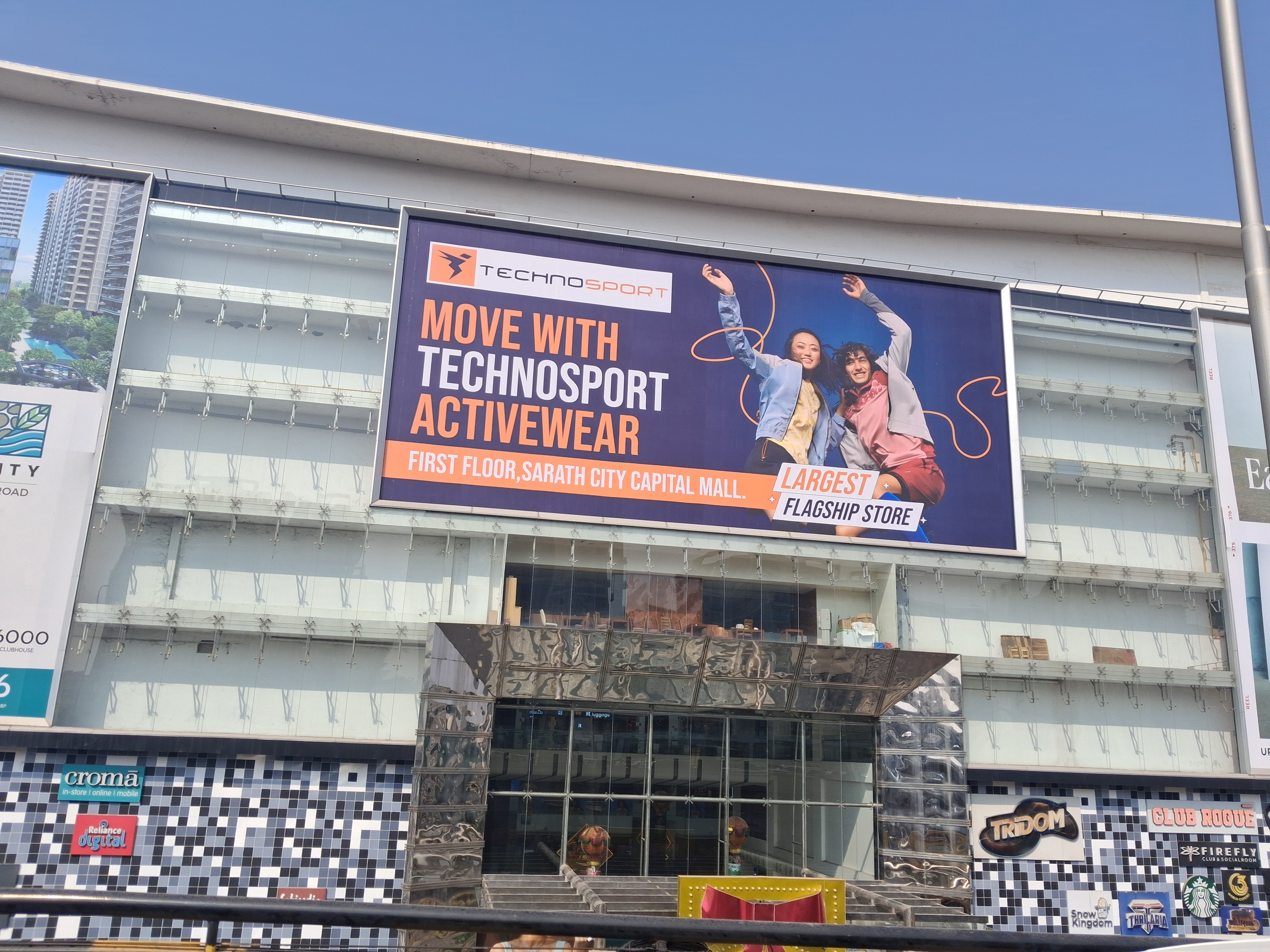
Sarath city capital mall

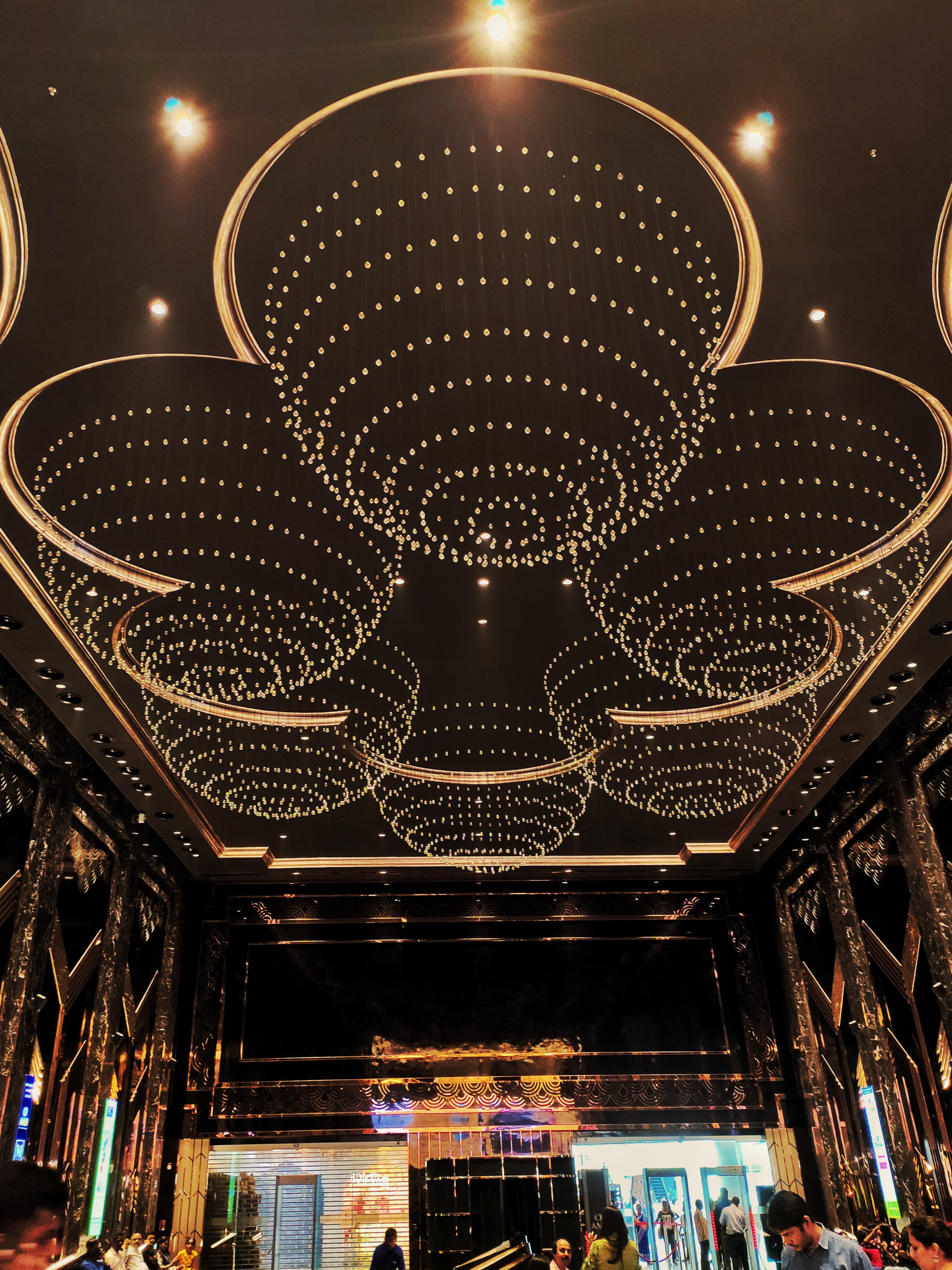
AMB Cinemas in mall

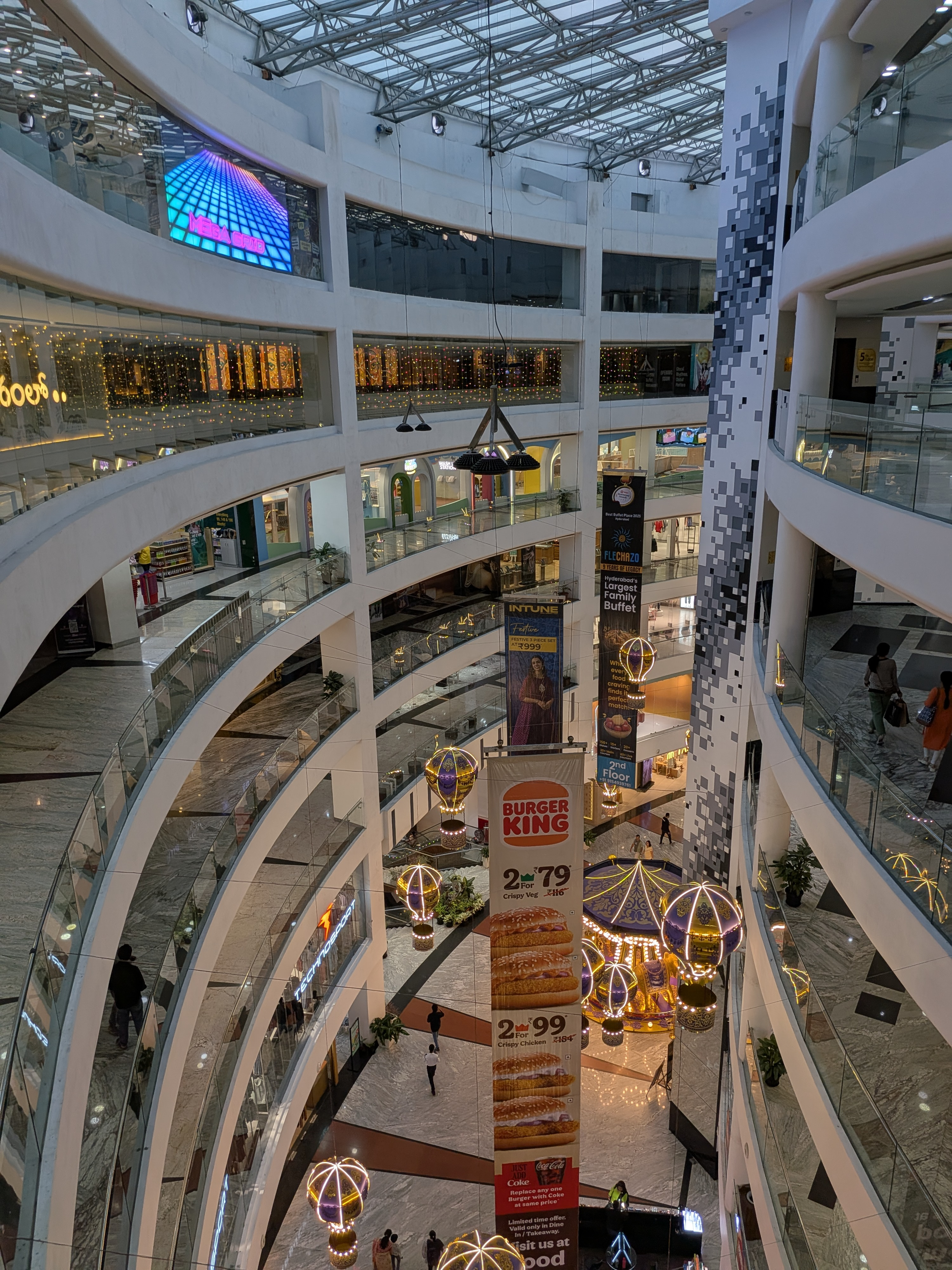
a part of the inside of the mall

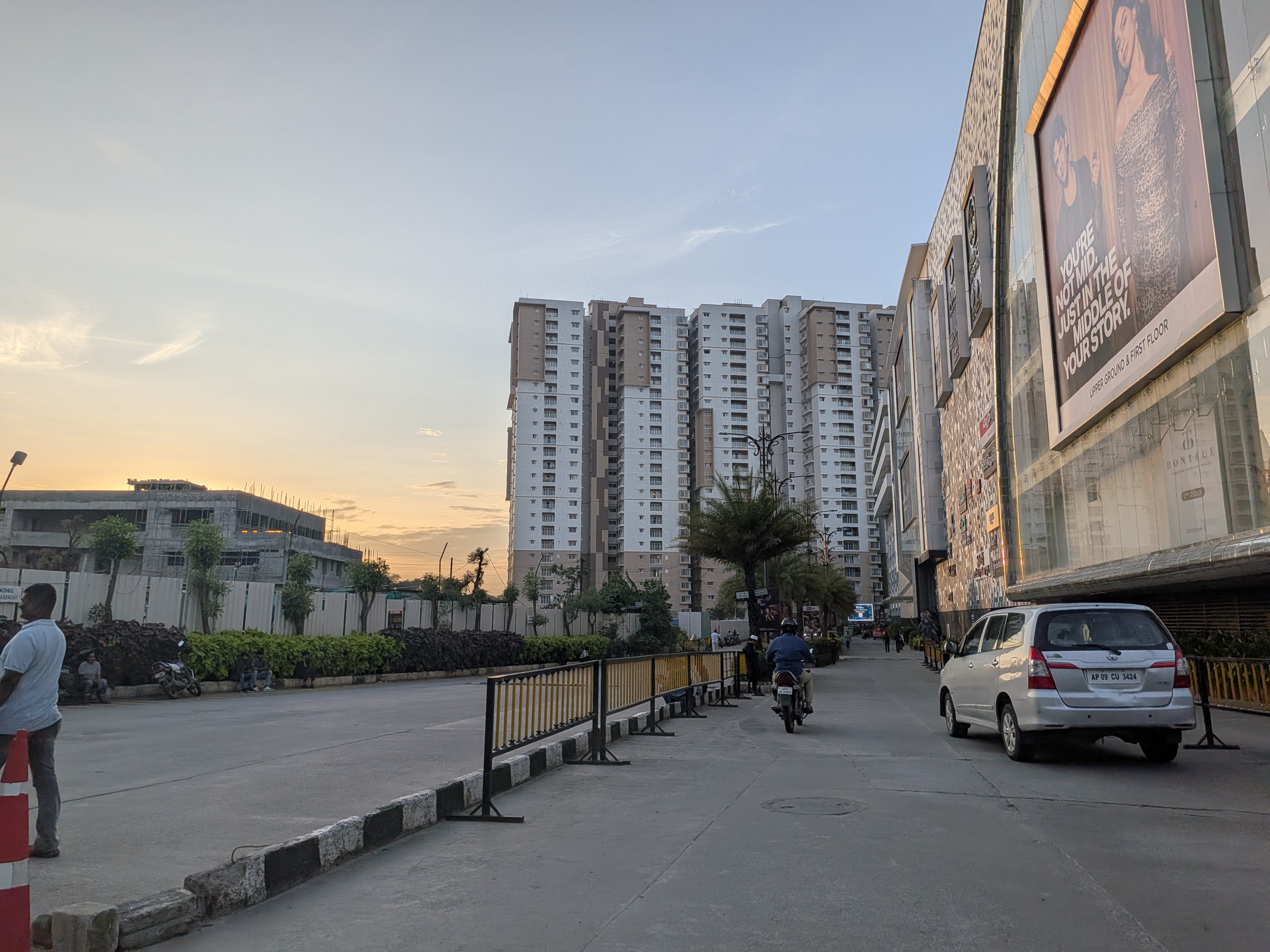
road to the parking lot of the mall

== Amenities ==
=== Brands ===
- Zudio, Centro, Comet, Vanheusen, Shoppers Stop, Bata, Reebok, Forever 21, Mia by Tanishq, etc
- The mall also features a local multiplex by AMB Cinemas
