= United Group (Bangladesh) =

- Type: Private
- Industry: Conglomerate
- Website: united.com.bd

United Group is a business conglomerate in Bangladesh. Their stakes include: healthcare, education, finance, insurance, retail, power, real estate, terminal-port management, manufacturing, shipping, textile etc.

== History ==
The group started it's operation in 1978 as a joint venture between 4 partners. In 1986, two more joined the group.

In 2018, the group's chairman and directors were scrutinized by the Bangladeshi Anti-Corruption Commission for their connection to the Panama Papers. In 2020, the group completed succession takeover of the new generation from the original founders. This led to a split within the group, and two core investor who owned 10% of the company filed legal complaints against the rest of the investors.

In February 2022, United Group inaugurated the shopping arcade Centrepoint beside the country's main airport, Hazrat Shahjalal International Airport. In 2024, the group bought out stakes of United Finance and United Insurance from Duncan Brothers. In 2025, interim government reclassified the group's powerplant from IPP to captive power plants and required them to pay thousands of crores in arrears. United paid a portion and appealed the decision.

In early 2026, a Dhaka court imposed travel ban on the company founder and former chairman along with two others for investigation into corruption allegations.

In October 2026, BSEC ordered probe into insider trading by United Group official on UPGDC and Khulna Power Company.

== Sectors ==
- Centrepoint, Dhaka - Shopping mall
- M A Rashid Hospital
- Medix Signature Clinic
- Moulvi Tea Garden
- Orange Solution - enterprise service
- Teknaf Land Port
- United College of Nursing
- United Medical College and Hospital
- Unimart - Shopping mall
  - Chef's table
- United Finance
- United Hospital (Now known as Continental Hospital)
- United International University
- United Ashuganj Power Limited - Combined cycle power plant
- United Power Generation & Distribution Company (UPGDC)
- United Makkah Madinah - Hajj agency
- United Engineering & Power services - operation and repair services
- United Securities - securities brokerage
- United Energy - power plant fuel sourcing
- United Sulpho - Chemicals Limited
- United Lube Oil Ltd
- United Tank Terminal
- United Shipping & Logistics Services Ltd
- United Aygaz LPG - LPG supplier
- United Maritime Academy (defunct)
