= Duncan Brothers (Bangladesh) Limited =

- Formation: 1859
- Headquarters: Dhaka, Bangladesh
- Region served: Bangladesh
- Official language: Bengali
- Staff: 18,500
- Website: www.duncanbd.com

Duncan Brothers (Bangladesh) Limited (Bengali: ডানকান ব্রাদার্স (বাংলাদেশ) লিমিটেড) is the largest tea producers in Bangladesh, and subsidiary of Lawrie Group of Camellia PLC. Imran Ahmed is the managing director of Duncan Brothers (Bangladesh) Limited.

== History ==
Duncan Brothers (Bangladesh) Limited traces its origins to brothers Walter Duncan and William Duncan from Glasgow who established a tea company in 1859 in Kolkata. It owns the following tea and rubber estates, Alinagar Tea Estate, Amo Tea Estate, Chaklapunji Tea Estate, Chandpur Tea Estate, Chatlapur Tea Estate, Etah Tea Estate, Hingazia Tea Estate, Karimpore Tea Estate, Longla Tea Estate, Lashkarpur Tea Estate, Mazdehee Tea Estate, Nalua Tea Estate, Pallakandi Tea Estate, Rajkie Tea Estate, Shamshernagar Tea Estate, and Silloah Tea Estate.

The powerplant of Octavius Steel and Company of Bangladesh Limited in Dhaka was nationalized in the 1950s.

In 1985, Duncan Brothers established United Insurance Limited. In 1989, United Leasing Company Limited was established. In the 1980s, ASMO Subhan (Abu Syed Mohammad Obaidus Subhan) joined the company as chief executive. In 1992, it purchased Surma Valley Tea Company. It started producing Duncan mineral water in 1994 under Duncan Products Limited. It established Camellia Duncan Foundation Hospital in 1994.

Camellia Duncan Foundation School was established in 2004. Duncan Properties Limited was established in 2005. On 1 July 2006, Imran Ahmed was appointed chief executive officer of Duncan Brothers. From 1978 to 2007, Duncan Brothers increased yield by 48 percent. It sponsored an exhibition of the Shilpacharya Zainul Abedin Art School which was supported by Bangladesh Enterprise Institute in 2009. United Leasing Company Limited was renamed to United Finance in 2014.

The government of Bangladesh cancelled the lease of Duncan Brothers on 512 acres land which housed workers of Chandpur tea estate, established in 1890. The government planned to build a Special Economic Zone on the site which led to protests by workers living there in 2015 and 2019. This put the homes and livelihood of 15 thousand workers of Chandpur tea estate at risk.

== Businesses ==
- Duncan Products Limited (Duncan mineral water)
- Chittagong Warehouses Limited
- Octavius Steel and Company of Bangladesh Limited
- Duncan Properties Limited
- United Insurance Limited
- United Finance
- Camellia Duncan Foundation Hospital, a 50 bed hospital.
- Camellia Duncan Foundation School

== See also ==
- JF (Bangladesh) Limited
