= Shyamoli =

Locality in Dhaka, Bangladesh

Coordinates: 23.774899°N 90.365553°E

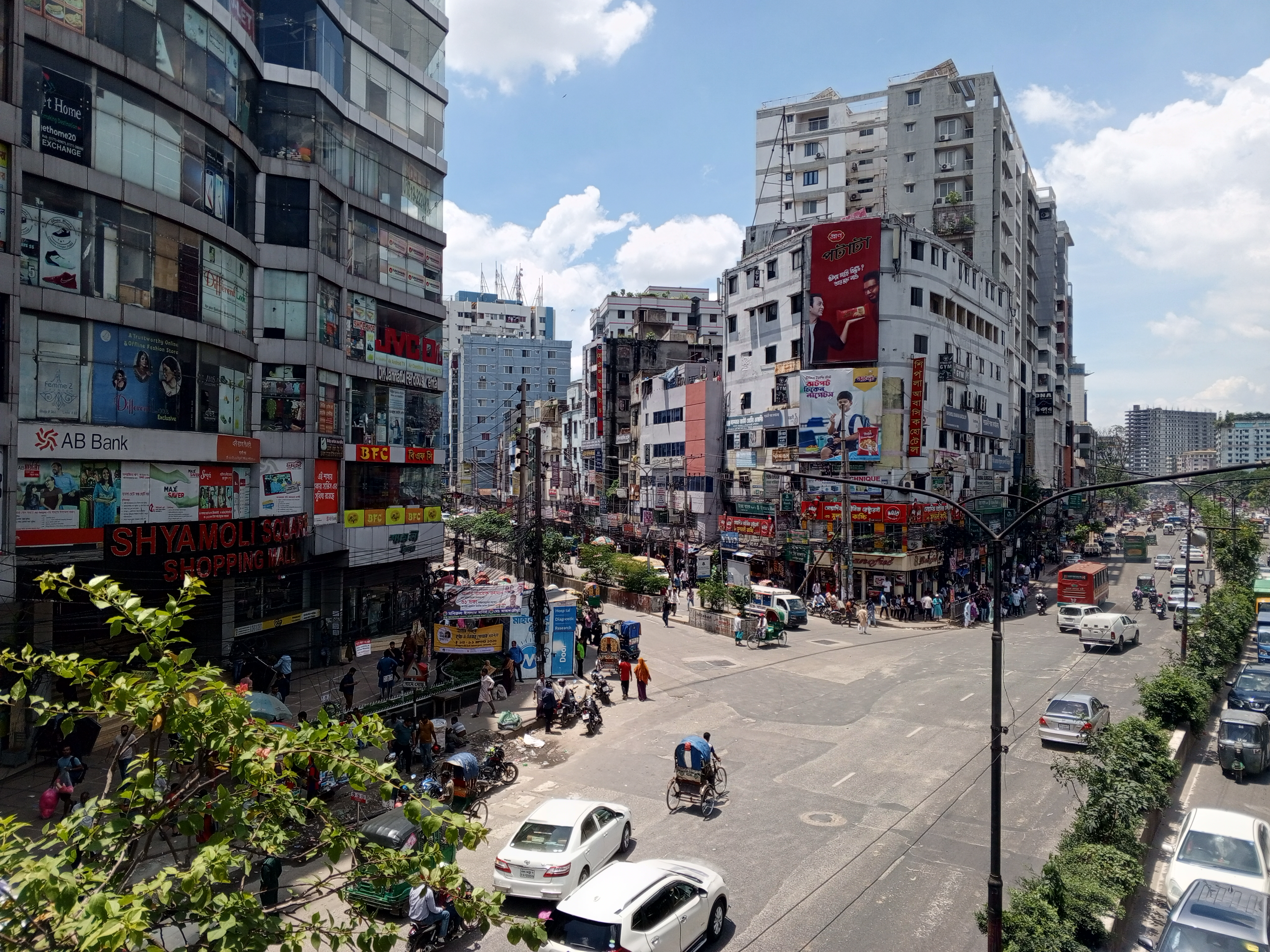
Shyamoli in 2025

Shyamoli (Bengali: শ্যামলী) is a locality in Dhaka, the capital of Bangladesh. It is to the northwest of Agargaon, neighbour of the Kallyanpur.

Shyamoli is a busy area of Dhaka. The previous landmark Shyamoli Cinema is destroyed and recently a shopping mall has emerged on its place, named Shaymoli Square. It is the largest shopping mall of Shyamoli. There is also a new cine-complex instead of Shyamoli cinema hall.

== Gallery ==
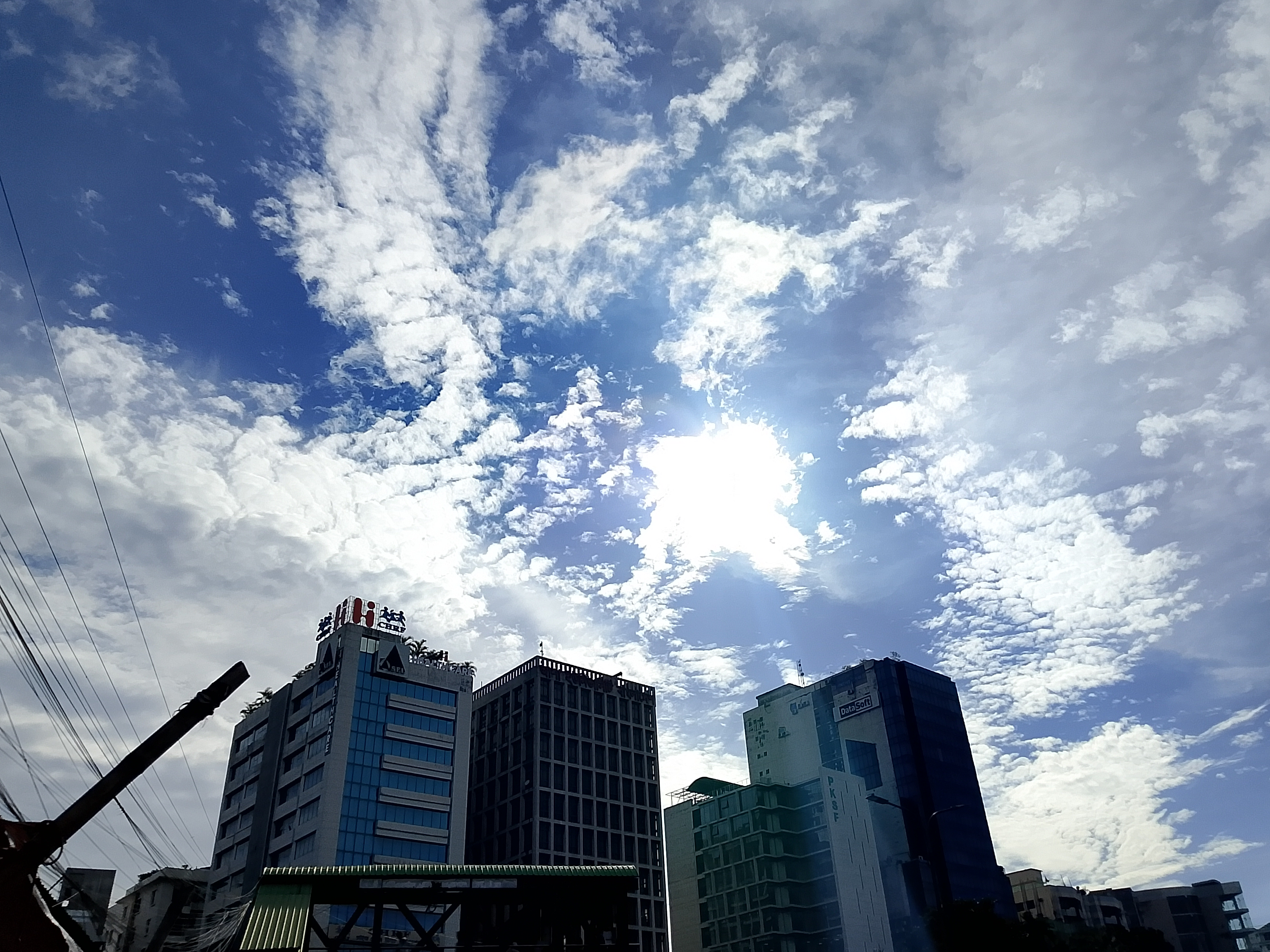
Shyamoli
