= Khwaja Ajmal =

Pioneer of Bengali-language film

Khwaja Mohammad Ajmal (Bengali: খাজা মোহাম্মদ আজমল, romanized: Khāja Môhômôd Ājmôl [kʰadʒa moɦammad adʒmɔl]) (1905 – 17 December 1971) was one of the pioneers of the Bengali-language films during the British Indian era (present-day Bangladesh). He was associated with early silent Bengali films such as Sukumari (1927) and The Last Kiss (1931). He was a member of the Nawab family of Dhaka.

He was born in 1905. He was the second child of Khan Bahadur Khwaja Mohammad Azam, superordinate of Panchayati raj in Dhaka and artist Meherbanu Khanam, daughter of the Nawab of Dhaka, Nawab Bahadur Sir Khwaja Ahsanullah. Journalist and poet Khwaja Mohammad Adil was his elder brother. He worked for Wari Club and Dhaka Sporting Association. He used to play table tennis and hockey in the 1930s and 1940s. He was the first motor vehicle user in Dhaka.

He was the first president of Mohammedan Sporting Club of Dhaka in 1936. He also refereed two exhibition football matches between Dhaka Sporting Association and Islington Corinthians in Dhaka on 21 and 22 September 1937. He also refereed the 1950 National Football Championship final held in Quetta, Pakistan.

He played a significant leading role both as an actor and a cameraman in Sukumari and The Last Kiss.

He joined the Dhaka station in Radio Pakistan as an announcer in 1949 and also participated in many radio dramas. One of his sons collaborated with the Pakistani forces during the Bangladesh Liberation War, which led to his assassination by the Mukti Bahini on 17 December 1971.
