= Centrepoint, Dhaka =

Shopping mall in Dhaka, Bangladesh

Centrepoint, Uttara
- সেন্টারপয়েন্ট, উত্তরা
- Location: Airport Road, Uttara, Dhaka 1229, Bangladesh
- Coordinates: 23.8525°N 90.4062°E
- Address: Dhaka-Mymensingh Highway, Dhaka 1229
- Opened: 2024
- Owner: United Group
- Floor area: 959,960 square feet (89,000 m2)
- Floors: LGL+UGL+6
- Parking: 270 parking spaces
- Website: www.centrepointbd.com

Centrepoint is a shopping mall in Dhaka, Bangladesh. Opened in 2024, it has a floor area of 89,183 m^{2} (959,960 sq ft). It is the third largest shopping mall in the city and the country behind Jamuna Future Park and Bashundhara City. Centrepoint is a project of the United Group. The mall is located in Uttara at Airport Road.

== Overview ==
Several popular local and international brands such as Tabaq Coffee, Miniso, Domino's, Cinnabon, KFC and Movenpick Ice Cream have established outlets in the mall and its food court, Chef's Table, which is a chain of food courts owned by the United Group. Books Kinokuniya opened its first outlet in Bangladesh and South Asia at Centrepoint on 19 June 2026.

The mall features an underground hypermarket, Unimart, which is a chain of supermarkets and hypermarkets also owned by the conglomerate. Centrepoint features a movie theatre by the Bangladeshi movie theatre chain Star Cineplex.

== Incidents ==
On 9 September 2026, a fire broke out at a restaurant in the food court on the fifth floor of the mall. It took one hour to bring the fire under control, with no reports of casualty.
