= Bangabandhu Road =

Street in Narayanganj, Bangladesh

Coordinates: 23.619213°N 90.5011647°E

Bangabandhu Road (Bengali: বঙ্গবন্ধু সড়ক) is a street in Narayanganj, Bangladesh. This road is also called BB Road (Bengali: বিবি সড়ক) for short. The length of this street is 1.5 km. It is the busiest street in Narayananj. It is associated with the Chashara and Nitaiganj circle of the city.

== History ==
Before 1959, the street was divided into three parts. The northern part of the street from Chashara to Gate no. 2 was named Delisley Road in 1922 after the then Chairman of Narayanganj Municipality. The next section was from Gate no. 2 to Mondalpara Pool which was named Sirkore Road after the next chairman. The last part of the street was from Mondalpara Pool to Nitaiganj in south which was named Western Road. Twelve years after the establishment of Pakistan and in the first anniversary of the presidency of Ayub Khan, the municipal authority merged the three streets into one and named it Quaid-e-Azam Road after Mohammad Ali Jinnah, founder of Pakistan. After the independence of Bangladesh in 1971, the name of the street was changed to Bangabandhu Road, named after Sheikh Mujibur Rahman, founder of Bangladesh.

== Issues ==
As hawkers used to sell products on both sides of this street, traffic jams were created on the street. On 16 January 2018, The superintendent of the city declared the street as a hawker-free street and banned hawkers from selling goods on both sides of the street. After the announcement, when the Narayanganj City Corporation authority went to evict the hawkers from the street, supporters of politician Shamim Osman clashed with them. Various efforts were made by the authority to evict the hawkers from Bangabandhu Road but they were unsuccessful. As most of the shopping malls built on both sides of Bangabandhu Road do not have parking facilities, cars are kept on both sides of the street, resulting in increased traffic jams. During the rainy season, the Bangabandhu Road is flooded with little rain, causing difficulties for vehicles and pedestrians.
