= DB City Mall =

Coordinates: 23.233°N 77.429°E

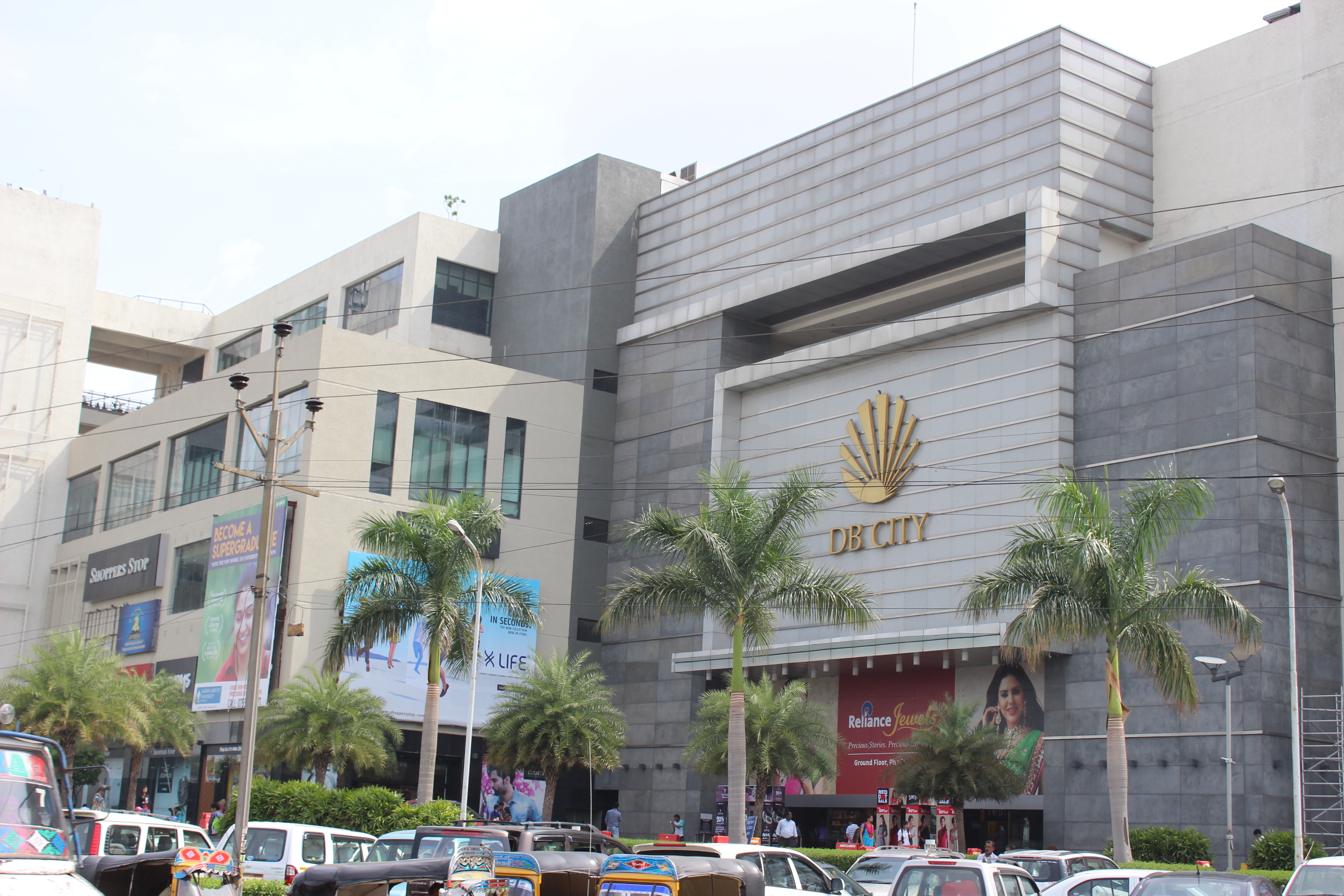
- Front entrance
- Address: Bhopal, Madhya Pradesh, India
- Opened: August 2010
- Manager: Shri Sudhir Agarwal
- Architect: Bentel International Architects
- Floor area: 1,300,000 sq ft (120,000 m^{2})
- Website: dbcity.in

The DB City Mall is a shopping complex located in Bhopal, Madhya Pradesh, India. It is situated near Maharana Pratap Nagar in the central business district. Opened in August 2010, it is one of the largest shopping centers in central India and the first shopping mall in Bhopal.

== Details ==
The complex has over 1.3 million square feet of floor space and six floors including a ground floor and a lower ground floor. It includes shopping stores, entertainment complexes and leisure activities.

The mall experiences over 10 million visitors per month, which increases to 18 million during the holiday season. It is operated by The Dainik Bhaskar Group.

The mall has a Courtyard by Marriott hotel with 152 rooms and 8 suites.
