= Asian Cinemas =

Indian multiplex cinema

- Industry: Entertainment (Movie Theatres)
- Founded: July 2011
- Headquarters: Hyderabad, India
- Key people: Daggubati Suresh Babu
- Website: asiancinemas.in

Asian Cinemas is an Indian multiplex cinema chain based in Hyderabad.
