= Jamuna Future Park =

Shopping mall in Dhaka, Bangladesh

Jamuna Future park

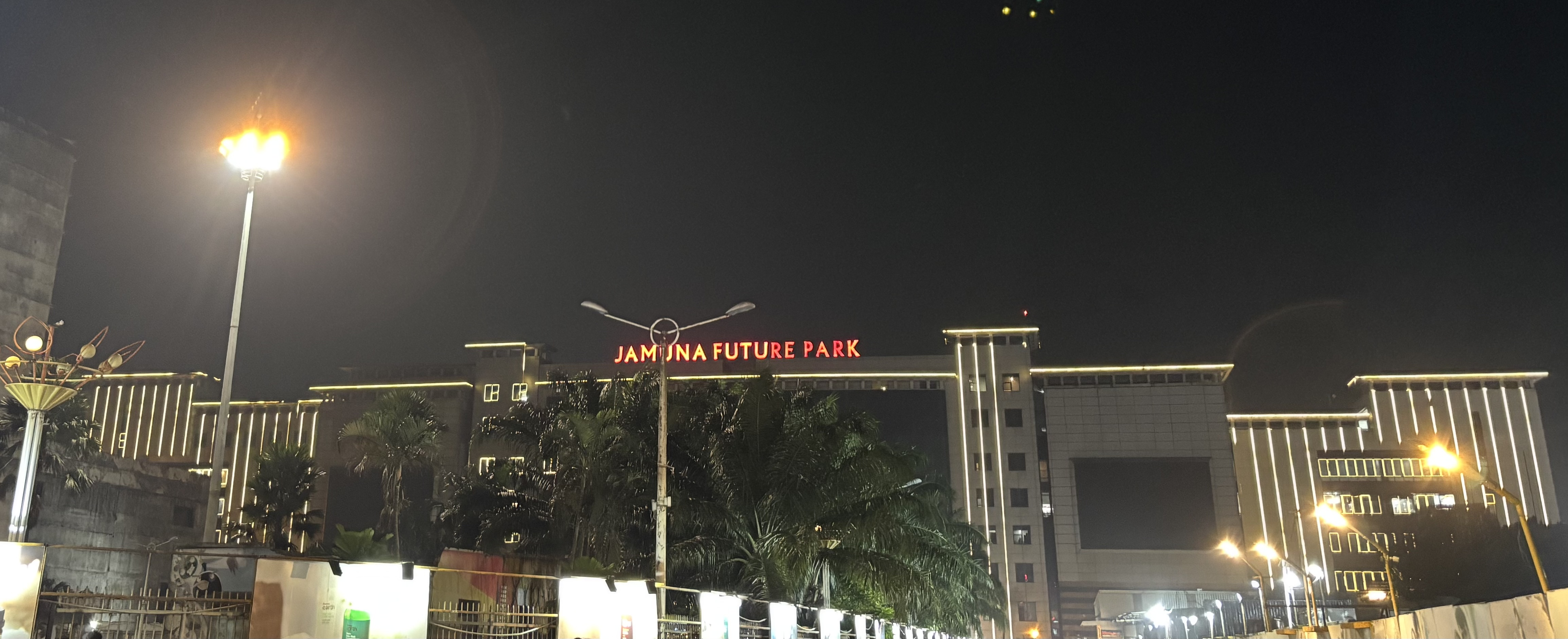
- Jamuna Future park in 2025
- Location: Bashundhara, Dhaka, Bangladesh
- Coordinates: 23°48′40″N 90°25′29″E
- Address: Ka-244, Pragati Sarani
- Opened: 6 September 2013; 13 years ago
- Developer: Jamuna Group
- Owner: Jamuna Group
- Architect: AJM Alamgir
- Num. of stores: 510
- Floor area: 4,100,000 square feet (380,000 m^{2})
- Floors: 8
- Parking: 2,500
- Website: jamunafuturepark.com

Jamuna Future Park is a shopping mall in Dhaka, Bangladesh. It was inaugurated on 6 September 2013. Construction began in 2002, by Jamuna Builders Ltd., a subsidiary of the Jamuna Group and the exterior was completed in 2008. It has a total floor area of 380,000 m^{2} (4,100,000 sq ft). It is the largest shopping mall in South Asia, and the 28th largest mall in the world.

== Location ==
The complex is spread across 33 acres (13 ha) of land between Kuril and Bashundhara Residential Area situated on the Pragati Sharani, neighboring upper class residential areas of Dhaka city like Gulshan, Banani, Baridhara, Bashundhara and Nikunja. It is relatively close to Shahjalal International Airport, offices of multinational companies, major embassies and other offices.

It can be accessed by the Kuril Flyover, which opened in August 2013, from both directions of the Airport Road.

== Structure ==
The centrally air-conditioned shopping complex has seven floors, equipped with its own 45MW power plant and WiFi internet. The lower basement and middle basement floor are reserved for car parking and a portion for a hypermarket, Wholesale Club, with a floor space of nearly 200,000 sq ft., it is regarded as the largest in the country. This mall has 2,500 car parking spaces. Level 1 is the base floor for all atria, facilities for live entertainment, musicals and fashion shows. From the ground floor to the fifth floor, there are several categories of outlets, non-branded shops, banks, online booths, and food courts. The fifth floor has space for a children's theme park, a gymnasium and a health club, two separate swimming pools for men and women, exhibition halls, banquet halls, a movie theater with seven individual halls, 22-lane bowling alley with karaoke facilities, and a musical and entertainment floor. The shopping mall is built with earth resistance as per Bangladesh National Building Code (BNBC) Zone 2.

There were plans of a JW Marriott hotel as part of the mall.

== Services ==
The world's largest Indian Visa Application Centre (IVAC) is located on the ground floor in this mall.

== Gallery ==
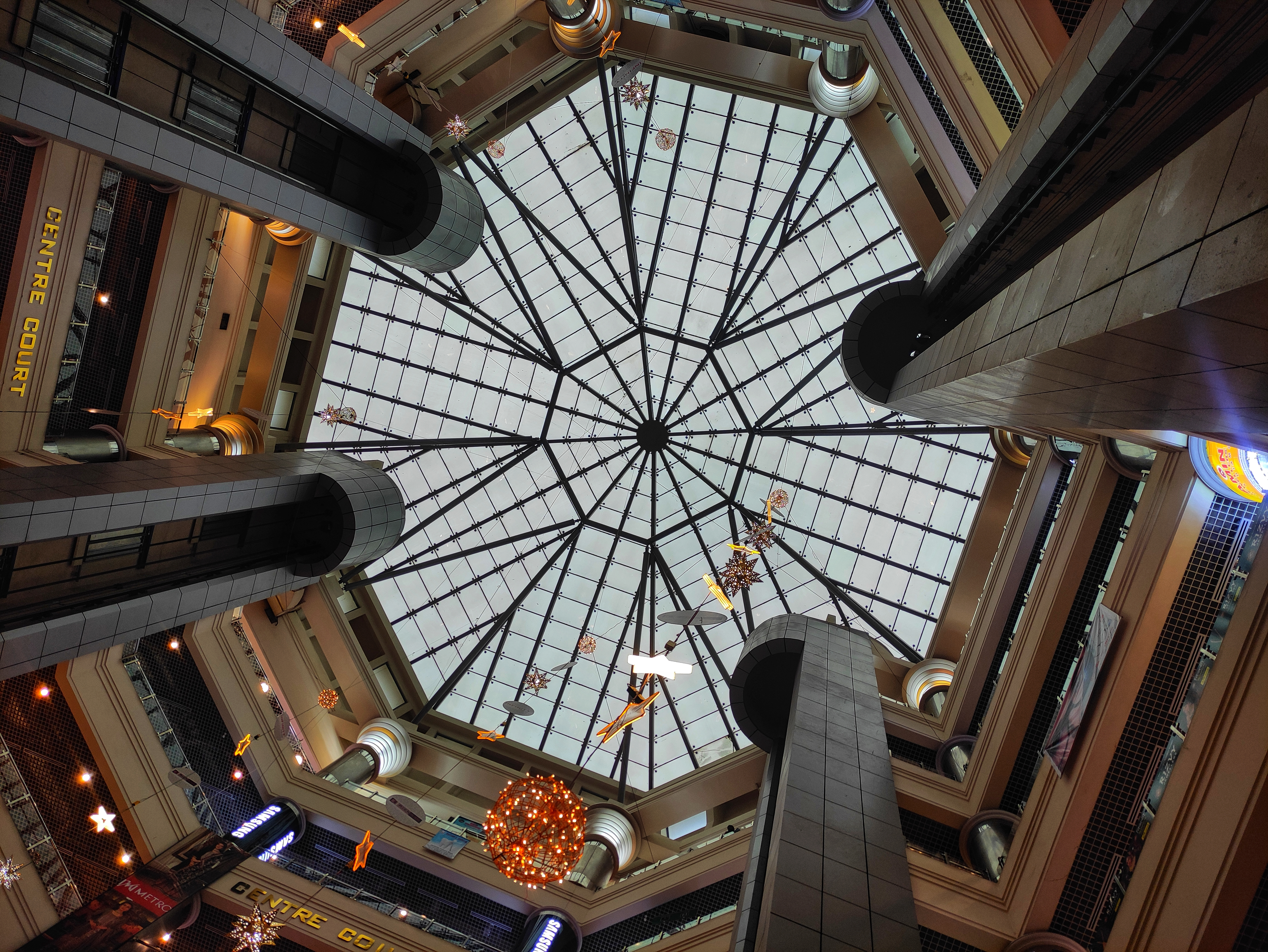
Roof dome of Jamuna Future Park

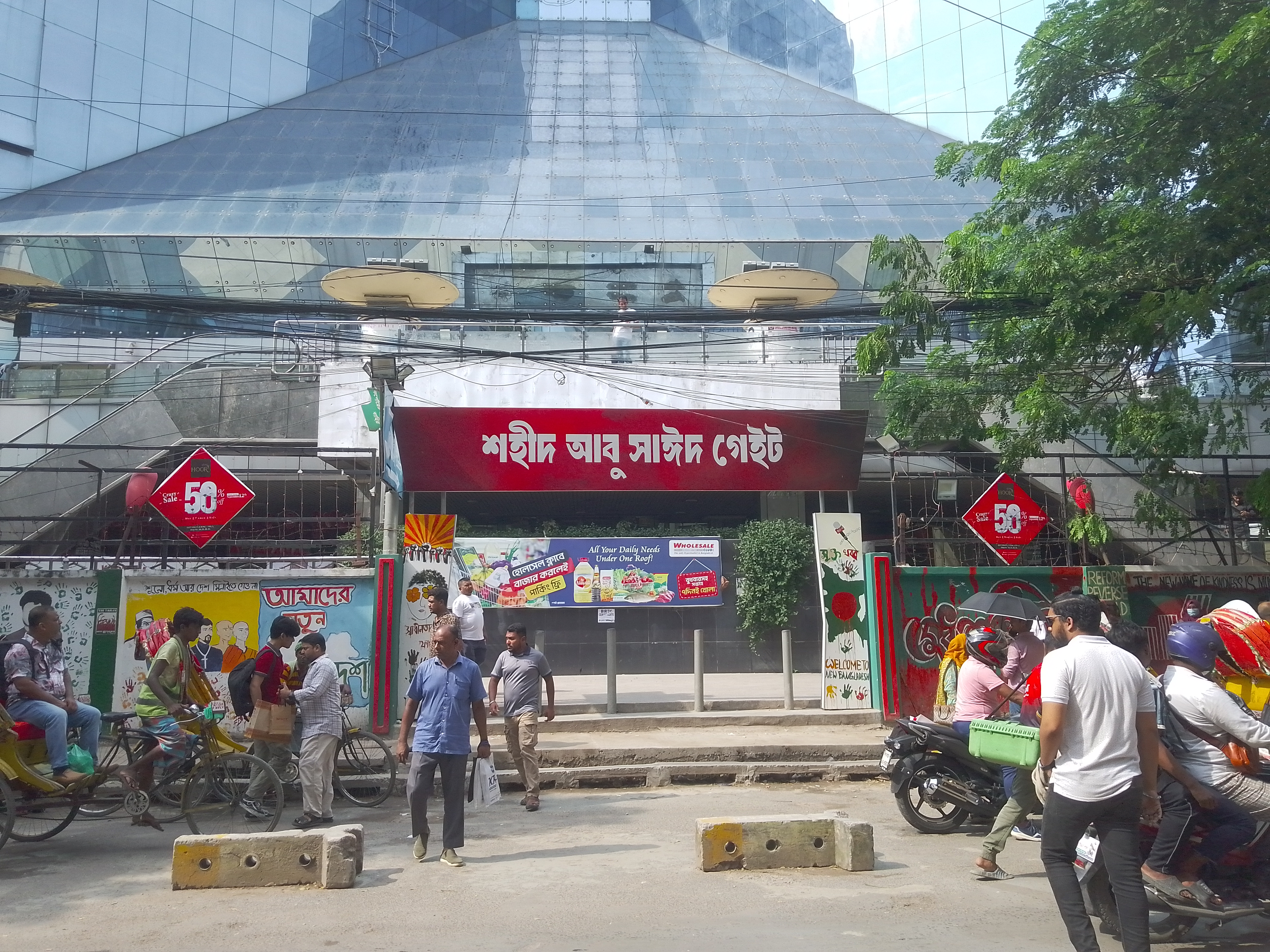
"Martyr Abu Sayed Gate" at Jamuna Future Park

== See also ==
- List of shopping malls in Bangladesh
- List of largest shopping malls in South Asia
- List of largest shopping malls in the world
