= Multiplex (movie theater) =

Movie theater complex

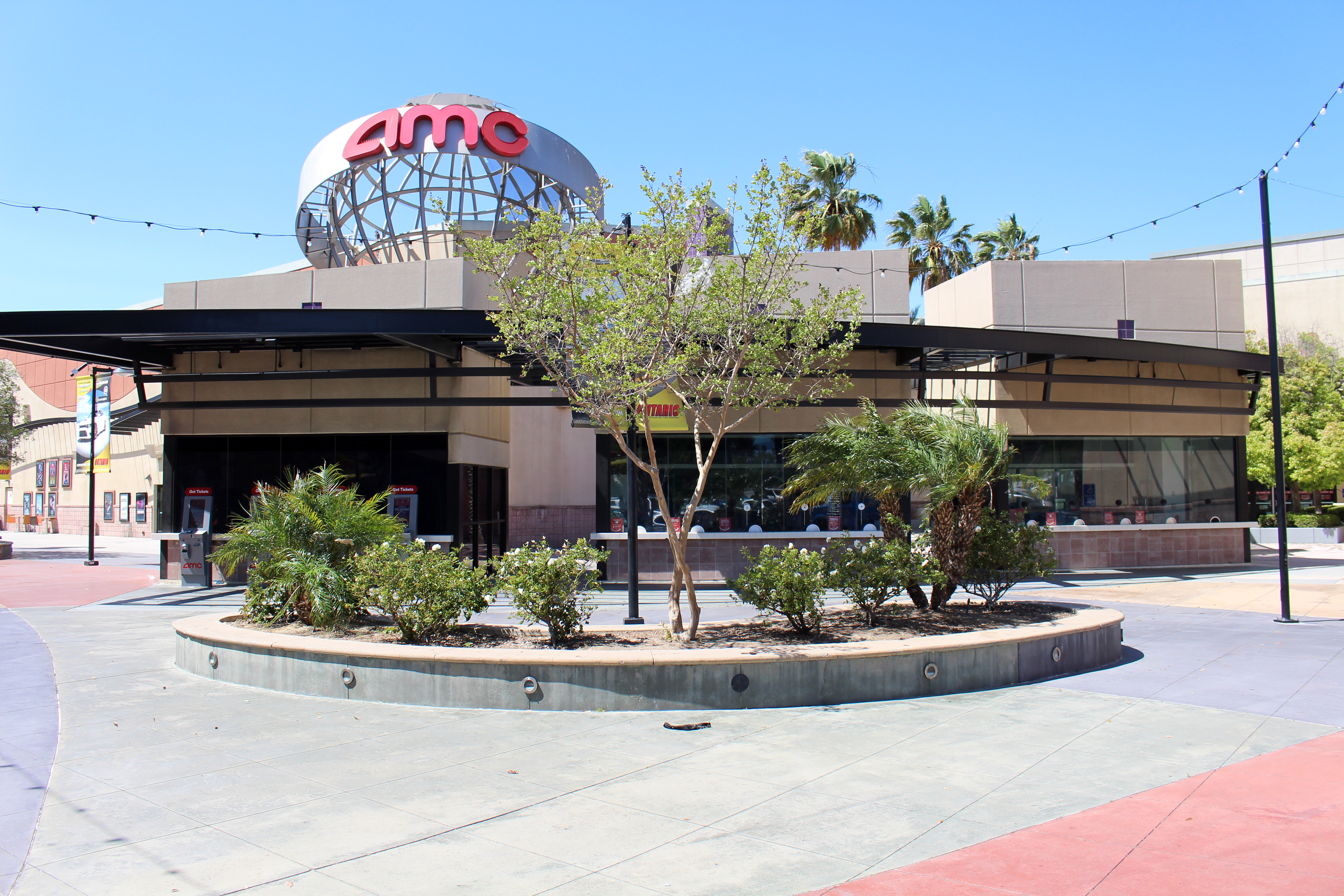
A typical AMC Theatres megaplex with 30 screens at Ontario Mills in Ontario, California.

A multiplex is a movie theater complex with multiple screens or auditoriums within a single complex. They are usually housed in a specially designed building. Sometimes, an existing venue undergoes a renovation where the existing auditoriums are split into smaller ones, or more auditoriums are added in an extension or expansion of the building. The largest of these complexes can sit thousands of people and are sometimes referred to as a megaplex.

The difference between a multiplex and a megaplex is related to the number of screens, but the dividing line is not well-defined. Some say that 16 screens and stadium seating make a megaplex, while others say that at least 24 screens are required. Megaplex theaters may have stadium seating or normal seating, and may have other amenities often not found at smaller movie theaters; multiplex theaters often feature regular seating.

The Kinepolis-Madrid Ciudad de la Imagen megaplex in Spain, owned by the Belgian Kinepolis Group, is the largest movie theater in the world by seats, with 25 screens and a seating capacity of 9,200, including one 996-seat auditorium.

== History ==
=== Origins ===
The question of who invented the multiplex is "one of the longest-running debates in movie theater history." In a 2004 book, Ross Melnick and Andreas Fuchs identified five leading candidates: James Edwards, Sumner Redstone, Stanley Durwood, Charles Porter, and Nat Taylor.

In 1915, exhibitor Charles Porter opened the Duplex Theatre in Detroit, Michigan, the first known instance of a dual-auditorium movie theater. It had twin 750-seat auditoriums in a single building, sharing a common box office and entrance. The Duplex Theatre's history is poorly documented and it is unknown why Porter built his theater that way, though it was apparently a bit too advanced for its time. It closed in 1922 and was remodeled into a ballroom.

In about 1915 two adjacent theatres in Moncton, New Brunswick, under the same ownership, were converted to share a single entrance on Main Street. After patrons entered the door, there were separate ticket booths for each theatre, and different programs were shown. The arrangement was so unusual that it was featured by Robert Ripley in his Believe It or Not! comic strip. Before multiplexes, some cinemas did show different films at the same time in one auditorium, such as in Cairo, Egypt, reported in 1926.

In 1930, the Regal Twins in Manchester, England, became the world's first multiplex, followed by Studio 1 and 2 in Oxford Street in London in 1936.

In 1937 James Edwards twinned his Alhambra Theater in the Los Angeles area by converting an adjacent storefront into a second "annex" screen. While both screens would show the same feature movie, one would also offer a double bill. It did not convert to showing different movies on both screens until some time after Nat Taylor (see below). On February 25, 1940, the Patricia Theater in Aiken, South Carolina made news by becoming what is believed to be the first two-screen theater in the United States, showing different movies when operator H. Bert Ram added a screen to an adjoining building and shared a common box office. The main screen remained the Patricia Theatre and the Patricia Annex became known as the Little Patricia.

In December 1947 Nat Taylor, the operator of the Elgin Theatre in Ottawa, Canada, opened a smaller second theater ("Little Elgin") next door to his first theater. It was not until 1957, however, that Taylor decided to run different movies in each theater, when he became annoyed at having to replace films that were still making money with new releases. Taylor opened dual-screen theaters in 1962 in Place Ville Marie in Montreal, Quebec, and at Yorkdale Plaza in Toronto, Ontario, in 1964.

Also in late 1947, but in Havana, Cuba, the Duplex movie theater was built to share the vestibule and ancillary facilities with the previously existing Rex Cinema (open since 1938); they were both designed by the same architect, Luis Bonich. The programming was coordinated, so that one of them showed documentary and news reels. while the other was showing feature films. They were in use at least until the 1990s.

In 1963, AMC Theatres opened the two-screen Parkway Twin at the Ward Parkway Shopping Center in Kansas City, a concept which company president Stanley Durwood later claimed to have come up with in 1962, realizing he could double the revenue of a single theater "by adding a second screen and still operate with the same size staff". Edward Jay Epstein has credited Durwood with creating the multiplex in 1963. Also, the shopping center structure where the Parkway was located could not support a large theater, so two small theaters were built to avoid that issue, and at first both theaters played the same film.

In 1965, the first triplex was opened in Burnaby, Canada by Taylor Twentieth Century Theaters. AMC followed up on the Parkway Twin with a four-screen theater in Kansas City, the Metro Plaza, in 1966, and a six-screen theater in 1969. Durwood's insight was that one box office and one concession stand could easily serve two (or more) attached auditoriums. AMC was a pioneer in automating its projection systems, meaning that a single non-union projectionist could run all the movie projectors at a multiplex. Another AMC innovation was to offset the starting times of films, so that staff members who previously had downtime while films were playing at a single-auditorium theater would now be kept continuously busy servicing other auditoriums. Over the next two decades, AMC Theatres under Durwood's leadership continued to innovate as it built one multiplex after another with more screens across the United States, though its early multiplexes from the 1960s and 1970s are now regarded as relatively small by 21st-century standards. According to Melnick and Fuchs, although Durwood was technically not the first person to build a multi-auditorium movie theater, he was "the man perhaps most responsible for driving the industry into 'splitsville'".

In 1965, Martin's Westgate Cinemas became one of the first indoor two-screen theaters in Atlanta, Georgia. Located in East Point, Georgia, it was later converted into a three-screen venue after a fire partially destroyed one of the theaters. The Disney family film Those Calloways had its world premiere at the Westgate, the only film to have been so honored at that theater.

In 1973, Sumner Redstone, as the head of National Amusements, was the first film exhibitor to trademark and regularly use the term "multiplex."

=== Megaplex ===
Opening in April 1979, the 18-screen Cineplex, co-founded by Nat Taylor in Toronto's Eaton Centre, became the world's largest multi-theater complex under one roof. It was expanded to 21 screens by at least 1981.

In September 1988, Kinepolis Brussels was opened by Albert Bert with 9 screens, which eventually expanded to 25 screens and 7,600 seats, and is often credited as being the first "megaplex".

Meanwhile, during the 1980s, an elderly Durwood, in the "twilight of his prolific career at AMC", began a transition from his traditional pattern of squeezing "as many screens as possible ... into small multiplexes" to building megaplexes which were truly gigantic in scale: a "new supersized movie house for a supersized nation". This coincided with the development of modern big-box stores and warehouse clubs in the United States, and in retrospect can be seen as part of a larger national movement to "grow retail spaces ever bigger."

On December 13, 1996, AMC Ontario Mills 30, a 30-screen theater, opened in Ontario, California, and became the theater with the most screens in the world. This was eventually tied by other AMC 30-screen theaters.

=== Venue sizes and demand ===
During the 1980s and 1990s, AMC Theatres was at the forefront of a massive boom in multiplex and megaplex construction across the United States. From 1988 to 2000, the number of screens in the United States exploded from roughly 23,000 to 37,000. By the end of 1997, the United States was home to 149 megaplexes with over 2,800 screens.

The newer venues, especially the megaplexes, often wiped out smaller theaters and led to market consolidation. Aging single-screen movie palaces in congested downtown areas simply could not compete against the new suburban megaplexes with their profusion of convenient choices (in terms of films and showtimes), gigantic screens, stadium seating, armrest cup holders, video arcades, spacious parking lots, and state-of-the-art projection and surround sound technology. In some areas, "megaplexes became not just another option for moviegoers, but soon the only one, having driven all other theaters out of business". From 1995 to 2004, the total number of theaters in the United States fell from 7,151 to 5,629.

One contributor to the wild explosion in the number of screens was the enactment of the Americans with Disabilities Act of 1990. The new law imposed expensive wheelchair ramp requirements for all new or renovated movie theaters with more than 299 seats. Such ramps took up as much as one-third of the space occupied by a theater, meaning all that space was no longer available for revenue-generating seats. AMC and its competitors discovered that it was more cost-effective to divide a multiplex into a large number of smaller auditoriums which each had 299 seats or less, than to build several big auditoriums which all required ramps. To fill all those seats, multiplexes began to book the same films across multiple screens with showtimes at every hour or half-hour.

Multiplexes and megaplexes supposedly have two major advantages over traditional single-screen movie theaters: they can share common infrastructure and staff across multiple auditoriums, and variations in auditorium size enable them to better match capacity to demand. However, movie theater operators eventually discovered the problem with stadium-size movie theaters is that they share the same flawed business model as stadiums: high fixed operating costs, combined with the fact that very few films in any given year can actually fill all those seats. Average occupancy is around 10-15%—meaning that the majority of films are being shown to empty seats. Nearly all major U.S. movie theater companies ultimately went bankrupt as a result of this hasty development process. Among the few that were able to avoid bankruptcy were AMC Theatres and Cinemark Theatres.

The boom in new screens in the U.S. in the late 1990s and early 2000s led to multiple changes to Hollywood's distribution model. During the 1990s, American film studios experimented with distributing quirky indie films and art films to megaplexes which would have had a much harder time finding a broad theatrical audience in earlier eras, such as the 1999 hit Being John Malkovich. However, after the turn of the 21st century, as multiplex and megaplex owners came to realize they could screen large-budget blockbuster films all day by staggering showtimes across multiple screens, movie studios jumped onto the blockbuster bandwagon and shifted their film slates towards blockbuster films based on existing media franchises.

== Largest theater multiplex ==
On 17 September 1998, the world's largest theater multiplex, Kinepolis Madrid, opened in Spain, with 25 screens and 9,200 seats, each seating between 211 and 996 people.

== Tallest theater multiplex ==
Europe's tallest theater multiplex is the Cineworld Glasgow Renfrew Street in Glasgow, Scotland, United Kingdom at 203 feet. Opened in 2001, it has 18 screens and seats 4,300 people.

CGV Cinemas San Francisco 14, is a 14-auditorium movie theater multiplex in a former eight-story Cadillac dealership building on Van Ness Avenue at O'Farrell Street. It opened on 10 July 1998, as the AMC 1000 Van Ness with 3,146 seats listed.

== Around the world ==
=== Australia ===
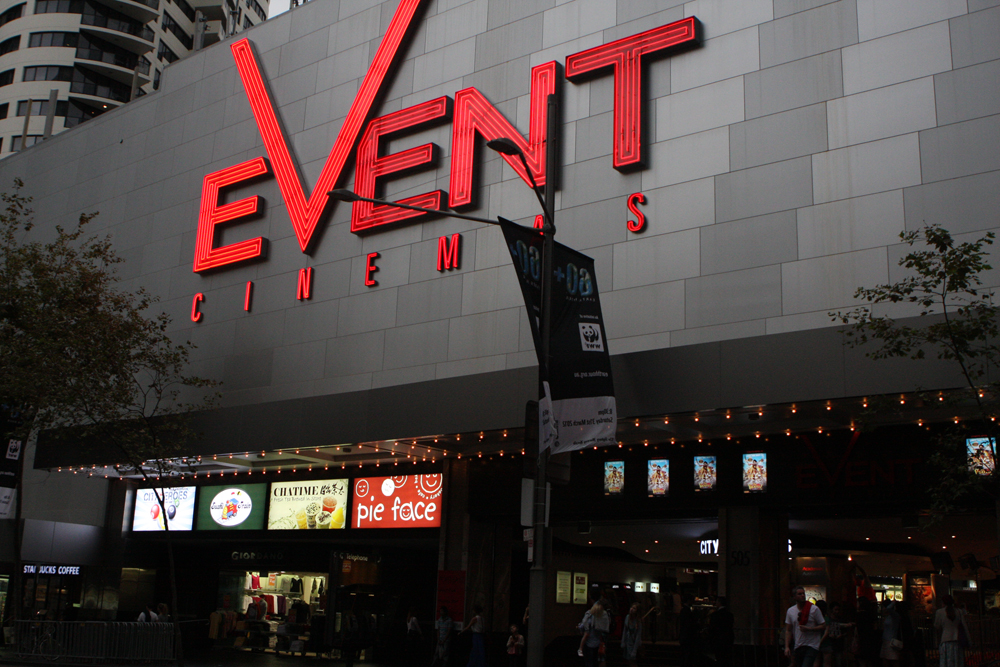
Event Cinemas is the largest film exhibitor in Australia and New Zealand.

The largest theater megaplex in the Southern Hemisphere is the 26-screen Marion MEGAPLEX in Adelaide, South Australia. The megaplex was originally a 30-screen megaplex branded as Greater Union but was modified to accommodate Gold Class and V-Max screens and was re-branded as Event Cinemas. The auditoriums sit on top of Westfield Marion, which is the largest shopping complex in Adelaide.

=== Bangladesh ===
Star Cineplex is the pioneer of Bangladeshi multiplexes. As of September 2026, the cinema chain has 27 screens at 9 locations in 3 cities. Blockbuster Cinemas and Lion Cinemas are the other two multiplexes in the country, which have 7 and 4 screens, respectively.

=== Belgium ===
Kinepolis Brussels, the first cinema to carry the Kinepolis brand, was the biggest and a pioneer in the megaplex industry when it opened in 1988. It introduced various innovations in visual, audio and conceptual aspects of cinema, such as hosting guests and special events. It now has 28 screens and 6270 seats.

=== Brazil ===
In 1999, the 18-screen UCI New York City Center multiplex was opened in Barra da Tijuca, Rio de Janeiro to become the largest in Brazil.

=== Canada ===
Canada's largest movie theaters over the years have been located in Toronto. As mentioned above the 18- (later 21-) screen Cineplex was the movie theater with the most screens in the world until the late 1980s, but remained the largest movie theater in Canada until it was closed at the turn of the 21st century. In 1998, AMC expanded to Canada, building large movie theatres with as many as 24 screens before opening a 30-plex there in 1999, which is the AMC Interchange 30. Then in 2008, the 24-screen AMC Yonge Dundas 24, adjacent to the Eaton Centre, was completed. Cineplex Entertainment purchased the theater in 2012, along with several other Canadian AMC megaplexes, bringing the company full circle. After that, some more were closed or sold to Empire Theatres. AMC exited Canada by closing the AMC Interchange 30 in 2014.

=== France ===
France's largest movie theaters are: 27-screen UGC Ciné Cité Les Halles (3,913 seats) in Paris, 23-screen Kinépolis - Château du Cinéma in Lomme (7,286 seats), 22-screen UGC Ciné Cité Strasbourg (5,275 seats) and 20-screen MK2 Bibliothèque in Paris (3,500 seats).

=== Greece ===
Greece's largest multiplex is Village Rentis, which features 18 mainstream screens, two comfort (special type of a mainstream screen, better seating and less auditorium), three RealD 3D screens and one summer screen. In total it features 21 screens.

=== Hungary ===
Hungary's first multiplex, the Corvin Budapest Film Palace, opened in September 1996 followed shortly after by Cineplex Odeon's first overseas venture, the six-screen Cinpelex Odeon Polus Center, and a nine-screen multiplex in the Duna plaza run by Village Roadshow and US-owned InterCom, that both opened in November 1996.

=== India ===
In India, the mushrooming of multiplexes started since the mid-1990s. Cinema chains such as PVR INOX, Mukta A2 Cinemas, Miraj Cinemas, Asian Cinemas, Cinepolis, MovieTime Cinemas, AGS Cinemas, MovieMAX, Rajhans Multiplex and Wave Cinemas operate multiplexes across the country. The largest multiplex in India is the 16-screen multiplex Mayajaal in Chennai.

=== Japan ===
The first multiplex in Japan was built by Warner Bros. in 1993 but the multiplexes were outside Japan's nine largest cities until Shochiku built Cinema World to the west of Tokyo in 1995. By 2000, multiplexes accounted for 44% of the market with the number of screens in Japan increasing rapidly from less than 2,000 in 1998 to nearly 3,000 in 2001. The expansion in screens and multiplexes also reduced the reliance on the grosses from the nine key cities, with over half of a film's Japanese gross now coming from outside those markets.

=== Netherlands ===
In the Netherlands, there weren't many multiplexes until the millennial change. In April 2000, Pathé ArenA opened its doors in the ArenAPoort area in Amsterdam. It is the largest multiplex in the Netherlands and features 14 screens and 3250 seats in total. Nowadays a lot of other multiplexes are being set up, but so far none of them have surpassed Pathé ArenA's capacity.

=== Spain ===
Multiplexes (multicines) are very popular in Spain and they can be found in or close to most cities, displacing the traditional single-screen theaters. Many middle-sized and large cities have several of them, and they are also common in malls. The average number of screens per theater was 5.2 in 2016.

The Kinepolis-Madrid Ciudad de la Imagen megaplex has been the largest movie theater in the world since 1998, with 25 screens and a seating capacity of 9,200 including a 996-seat auditorium. Kinepolis-Valencia, built in 2001, boasts 24 screens and 8,000 seats. Meanwhile Kinepolis-Splau, in Barcelona, hosts the largest amount of screens, 28, and has a capacity of 2,638 seats.

=== United Kingdom ===
As noted above, the world's first multiplex, the Regal Twins, opened in Manchester in 1930. The first triplex in the UK was the ABC Cinema in Lothian Road, Edinburgh which opened 29 November 1969. The Regal Twins were converted in 1972 to a five-screen complex (Studios 1 to 5) by Star Group, as the first five-cinema complex in Britain.

In 1985, AMC Cinemas opened a ten-screen theater at The Point in Milton Keynes. This was AMC's first multiplex outside of the United States and saw a turnaround in the decline of the UK cinema industry. Cannon followed it with an eight-screen cinema in Salford Quays in 1986. The success of the cinema at Milton Keynes led to further expansion by AMC in the UK to the MetroCentre in Gateshead and then to Dudley, Telford, Warrington and by royal appointment to London, before it eventually sold its UK division to a joint venture which it had formed with United Artists and Cinema International Corporation, which later became UCI Cinemas in 1989. By the end of 1992, the 5 major exhibitors (UCI, MGM, Warner, National Amusements and Odeon Cinemas) had built 525 multiplex screens in the last eight years in the UK, with cinema admissions increasing from an all-time low of 54 million in 1984 to over 100 million. The increase in multiplexes led to 77% of the UK's screens being owned by the 5 major exhibitors. The increase in multiplexes around the country also reduced the importance of London from a revenue standpoint. Non-multiplex cinemas are now rare in the UK. In July 2000, Star City, Birmingham opened with a 30-screen Warner Village Cinemas (now a 25-screen Vue Cinemas with 5,079 seats), at the time the largest cinema in Europe.

=== United States ===
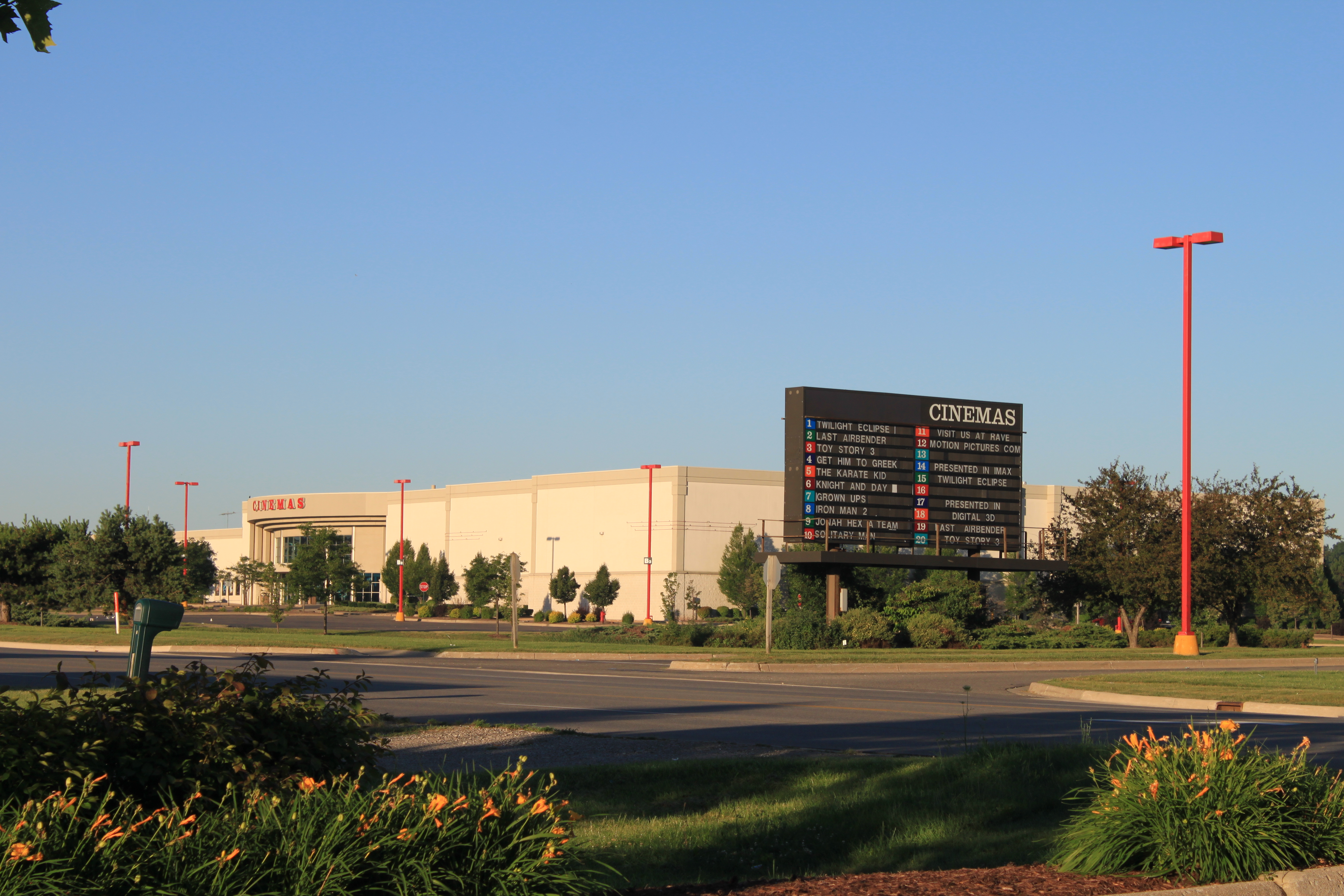
Rave Motion Pictures Ann Arbor (now a Cinemark)

The first triplex in the United States was created with the addition of a third screen to the Cheri theater in Boston in June 1967 owned by Ben Sack.

In the United States, only 10% of the 16,712 indoor movie theaters in 1981 had more than one screen, with 80% of the 10% only having two screens. The largest had 7 screens.

In 1982, the 14-screen Cineplex in the Beverly Center mall in Los Angeles became the country's largest upon opening. The Beverly Center Cinemas closed in June 2010.

Cineplex collaborated with Universal Studios to build an 18-screen multiplex in Universal City, California (now part of Universal CityWalk Hollywood), which opened July 4, 1987.

In December 1988, Studio 28 in Grand Rapids, Michigan, expanded from 12 to 20 screens into a 125,000 sq ft (11,600 m^{2}) facility with a seating capacity of 6,145, becoming the largest multiplex in the United States. Studio 28 closed in November 2008.

By 1994, building of multiplexes with 14-24 screens with 2,500 to 3,500 seats was the norm. The expansion of multiplexes also concentrated the market with the top ten exhibitors controlling 47% of the nation's screens compared to 27% in 1986. The AMC Grand 24 opened in Dallas, Texas, on May 19, 1995, as the first 24-screen megaplex built from the ground up in the United States and overtaking Studio 28 as the largest theater complex in the U.S. A 21-screen Edwards Theater opened at the Irvine Spectrum Center in Irvine, California, the same year. After a lease renewal dispute with the property owner, the AMC Grand 24 closed in November 2010. The building has been divided and reopened in 2012 as a Toby Keith–owned nightclub and a 14-screen first-run movie theater operated by Southern Theatres as the "AmStar 14". This theatre is now the Studio Movie Grill Northwest Highway as of 2013.

AMC has since opened many megaplexes with up to 30 screens, beginning with AMC Ontario Mills 30, which was billed by AMC in its advertising as the "world's largest theater" when it opened on December 13, 1996. Three months after AMC Ontario Mills 30 opened, Edwards Theaters opened their largest theater across the street with 22 screens, the Edwards Ontario Palace 22. If the two adjacent parking lots were counted as one, this meant the city of Ontario, California had 52 screens on one parking lot, more than anywhere else in the United States. The construction of these two adjacent megaplexes in the Inland Empire was the culmination of a "bitter lifelong rivalry" between the elderly chief executives of these two leading movie theater operators: AMC's Stanley Durwood (who died in 1999) and Edwards Theaters's James Edwards (who died in 1997). Edwards was powerful when he learned that Durwood had beaten him to a deal with Ontario Mills, and later told him, "I had to teach you a lesson". Although there were other locations where theater owners ruthlessly fought each other on a smaller scale, Ontario more than any other place became synonymous with self-destructive rivalry in the North American film exhibition industry. At the ShoWest conference in March 1997, Bill Kartozian, the former head of the National Association of Theatre Owners, told the attendees: "Thou shalt not Ontario each other".

By 2004, only 25% of movie theaters in the United States had one screen, and there were over 500 multiplexes with more than 16 screens.
