= United Finance =

Bangladeshi public financial services company

Coordinates: 23.74315°N 90.39527°E

United Finance PLC
- Type: Public
- Traded as: DSE: UNITEDFIN
- Industry: Financial services
- Predecessor: United Leasing Company Limited
- Founded: April 27, 1989 in Dhaka, Bangladesh
- Headquarters: Dhaka, Bangladesh
- Number of locations: 23 offices (2025)
- Area served: Bangladesh
- Key people: Mohammad Rafiqul Islam (MD)
- Services: Corporate Finance; Credit Sale Finance; Home Loan; Deposits
- Net income: BDT 1067 million (2023)
- Total assets: BDT 28,819 million (2023)
- Total equity: BDT 3,241 million (2023)
- Owners: United Group
- Number of employees: 700 (2024)
- Website: www.ufplc.com

United Finance (formerly United Leasing Company) is Bangladeshi financial company that provides investments, leases, loans, and term finance.

The company started its journey as a non-bank financial institution in 1989. It is listed in Dhaka Stock Exchange. The company was founded in 1989 and is headquartered in Dhaka, Bangladesh. United Finance collect around 80 percent of their funds directly from individual depositors.

As of 2015, the company had 25 branch offices across the country covering all 64 districts with financial services. The company has branch office in Dhaka, Bongshal, Gazipur, Tejgaon, Jinjira, Narsingdi, Shyamoli, Chattogram, Begumganj, Cox's Bazar, Cumilla, Rangamati, Jashore, Bogura, Sylhet, Rangpur, Dinajpur, Chuadanga, Barishal, Noakhali, Rajshahi, Khulna, Gazipur, Pabna, Belkuchi and Mymensingh district.

== History ==
In November 2024, United Group purchased United Finance PLC from its original owners for Tk. 174 crore.

== Major sponsorship ==
United Finance along with United Insurance would regularly organize international chess tournaments until 2009. The tournament was held biannually, and in 2009 it was hosted for the 9th time.
