= Unimart =

Bangladeshi supermarket chain

- Type: Private
- Industry: Super store
- Founded: 2013
- Parent: United Group (Bangladesh)
- Website: unimart.online

Unimart is a Bangladeshi chain of supermarkets and hypermarkets established in 2013. It is a subsidiary of United Group.

== History ==
- In July 2013, they opened a 40,000-square-foot (3,700 m^{2}) hypermarket called Unimart at Gulshan-2.
- In 2019, Unimart opened a new flagship outlet at Dhanmondi.
- In July 2020, Unimart announced its products would be available to be ordered online through Evaly. Unimart launched its online e-commerce platform in collaboration with delivery network PaperFly.
- In October 2021, another branch at Wari was opened.
- In June 2022, Unilever collaborated with Unimart to bring one of two liquid refilling machines from their R&D department to their store in order to reduce plastic waste.
- In April 2023, they opened a branch in Sylhet and a flagship branch in Gulshan-1 of 60,000 square feet (5,600 m^{2}).
- In May 2024, a new branch was opened at the Centrepoint mall adjacent to the Hazrat Shahjalal International Airport.
- In April 2025, Unimart's branch was broken into by an angry mob protesting genocide in Gaza.
- In 2026 a new Uttara branch was opened of Unimart.

=== Chef's Table ===
Chef's Table is a subsidiary of Unimart. It was soft launched on 1 July 2018.
