= The Last Kiss (1931 film) =

1931 film

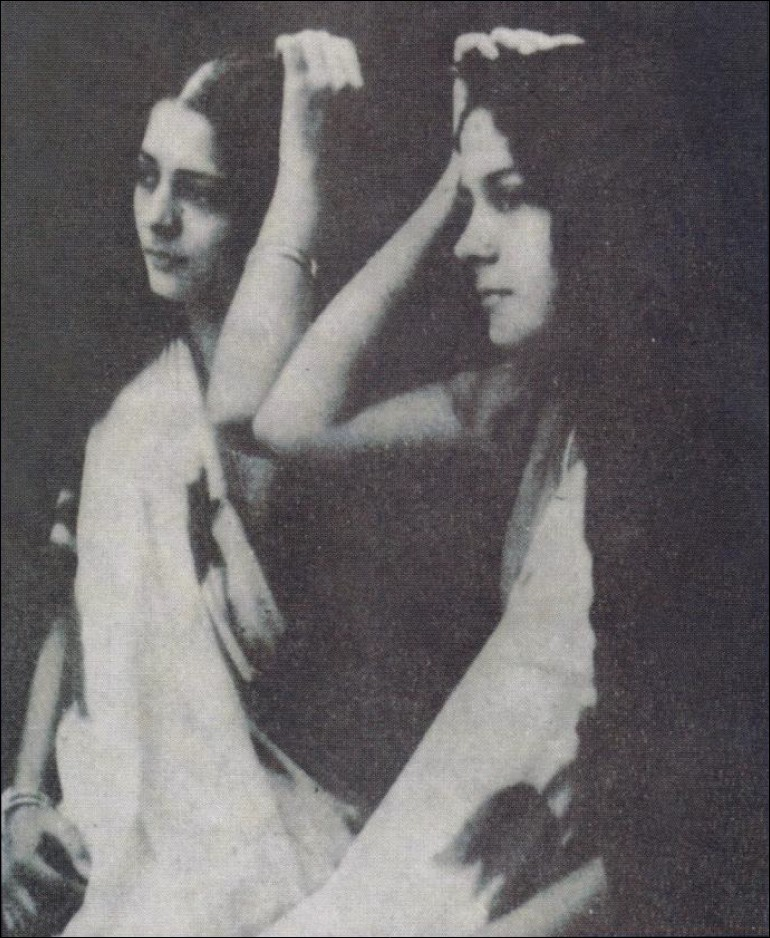
- One of the surviving stills featuring Lolita
- Directed by: Ambuj Gupta
- Cinematography: Khwaja Azad; Khwaja Ajmal
- Production company: Nawab family of Dhaka
- Release date: 1931
- Running time: 90 minutes
- Budget: ₹12,000 (equivalent to ₹3.6 million or ৳4.7 million in 2023)

The Last Kiss is a 1931 British Indian silent film, directed by Ambuj Gupta. The film was produced by the Nawab family of Dhaka and was the first film to be full-length feature film from eastern Bengal (modern-day Bangladesh). Shot in Dhaka, post-production work was done in Calcutta. The Last Kiss was released by the Mukul Theater. The film is considered lost.

The two actresses, Lolita and Charubala Devi, were brought from brothels in Dhaka. The film was sold to the Aurora Film Company of Calcutta.

== Plot ==
The full plot of the film is unknown, and sources vary about it. Khwaja Shahed said it was about a conflict between two family members. Khwaja Zahir said the plot involved the hero's wife being kidnapped, and the hero subsequently finding her in the bedroom of the villain, leading to a fight in which both the hero and his wife die.

== Cast ==
- Khwaja Ajmal as a hero
- Khwaja Nasrullah as a villain
- Lolita as the hero's wife
- Shailen Roy as the chief robber
- Khwaja Adel as a landlord
- Khwaja Zahir as a robber
- Syed Shahebe Alam as a police officer
- Charubala Devi as the landlord's wife
- Harimoti as a dancer and singer
- Khwaja Shahed as a child actor
- Baby Tuntun as a child actor

== Production ==
In 1928, Ambuj Gupta, a sports coach at the Jagannath College, directed the silent film Sukumari. In October 1929, shortly after finishing that project, he started to work on The Last Kiss. It featured cinematography by Khwaja Azad and Khwaja Ajmal. The 14-year-old lead actress, Lolita, was escorted from the Badamtoli brothel in Dhaka, and the supporting actress Charubala Devi was escorted from the Kumartuli brothel. The production was completely filmed in the eastern part of the (then) Bengal province of British India, and post-production concluded in Calcutta, India.

Title cards were displayed in three languages: Bengali, English, and Urdu. Gupta composed the title cards in the first two languages, and the Urdu titles were produced by Dr. W. H. Andalib Shadani. The Last Kiss is retrospectively considered to be the first Bangladeshi film to be considered full-length. (Note: Scholarly consensus disagrees with it being considered first Bangladeshi film to be full-length but other sources say it is a Bangladeshi film to be full-length.) It was produced by some young members of the Dhaka Nawab family.

== Release ==
The Last Kiss was released in 1931 in the Mukul Talkies (now the Azad Cinema). Ramesh Chandra Majumdar, a professor who attended the premiere, awarded two gold medals to Khaza Shahed and Baby Tuntun. In the same year, the only print of The Last Kiss' was bought by Aurora Film Company of Calcutta for distribution of the film. The film's print and negative are considered lost.

The cast and crew of the film were separated upon completing the film. The two actresses, Lolita and Charubala Devi, returned to their brothels, and director Ambuj Gupta emigrated to Calcutta.
