= Modhuban Cineplex =

Movie theater in Bangladesh

- মধুবন সিনেপ্লেক্স
- Interactive map of Modhuban Cineplex
- Former names: Modhuban (1974–2017)
- Address: Chandan Baisha Road, West Naruli, Chelopara; Bogra; Bangladesh
- Coordinates: 24.8507°N 89.3790°E
- Capacity: 345
- Type: Movie theater
- Screen: 1

Construction
- Opened: 10 October 1974
- Renovated: 15 October 2021

Modhuban Cineplex is a movie theater located in Bogra, Bangladesh. The movie theater was renovated and reopened on 15 October 2021. It will be upgraded to a multiplex in future. It is one of three remaining theatres in Bogra out of ten at the peak. The other theatres are Bambi Digital Cineplex and Sonia Hall.

== History ==
In 1969, M. A. Yunus started the construction of Modhuban in Bogra. Construction was delayed during the Bangladesh Liberation War in 1971. The movie theater was inaugurated in 1974. The Bangladeshi film Daku Mansoor by Ibne Mizan was screened at Modhuban on the opening day. Due to the movie theatre, the population of Chelopara continued to grow and it gradually turned into an affluent residential area. Modhuban was closed in 2004 due to the rise of obscene films in the country in the 1990s.

In 2013, Rokonuzzaman Md Eunus Rubel, son of Lieutenant Colonel Ashrafuzzaman and member of Bangladesh Cholochitro Prodorshok Samiti (film projectors society), inherited the ownership of the movie theater. In 2016, Shaikhuzzaman, a son of RM Yunus and one of the directors of Modhuban, questioned the quality of the movie theater when he saw the condition of the movie theater during the screening of Aynabaji. He then planned to renovate it.

After 1990s, it was closed two more times. After closing in 2013/2014 and later closing again in 2018 due to financial losses, its owner started the initiative to renovate and convert it as a multiplex. Due to incomplete renovations, Rubel was unable to open the movie theater in 2019 as planned. Then, due to the onset of the COVID-19 pandemic, it was not possible to proceed with the renovation work. After three and a half years of the renovation work, the movie theater was opened on 15 October 2021 with the new name "Modhuban Cineplex". Indian film Baazi, from Kolkata, was screened in the movie theater that day. The audience response to Baazi was lukewarm and with ticket sales below expectations. The film Chironjeeb Mujib was premiered in this movie theater instead of movie theatres in Dhaka. In 2022, the cinema hall was sold out for Hawa, every single showing for the movie which was a record for the theatre. According to Rubel, Talash and Omanush performed poorly in the theatre. He also mentioned showing Indian (Hindi language) movies were necessary for the theatre to survive financially. In July 2022, Ananta Jalil and Afiea Nusrat Barsha watched their movie, Din–The Day, at the Modhuban Cineplex.

== Features ==
The 345-seat movie theater has three classes of seats, two of which are known as the Gold Truck and the Premier Truck respectively. Three shows are held here every Friday and four on other days of the week. There are plans to convert this movie theater into a multiplex in future.
