= CineScope =

Mini theater in Narayanganj, Bangladesh

- সিনেস্কোপ
- Interactive map of CineScope
- Address: 6 Bangabandhu Road; Narayanganj; Bangladesh
- Location: Ali Ahammed Chunka City Library and Auditorium
- Coordinates: 23.6146496°N 90.5016405°E
- Owner: Mohammad Nuruzzaman Dalim
- Operator: CineMaker and Narayanganj City Corporation
- Capacity: 35
- Type: Mini cineplex
- Screens: 1

Construction
- Opened: September 20, 2019

CineScope is a mini theater located in Narayanganj, Bangladesh. This is the first mini theater in Bangladesh and the smallest mini theater in Asia.

== History ==
The founder of this mini cineplex is Mohammad Nuruzzaman Dalim. He designed the Ali Ahammed Chunka City Library and Auditorium building located in Narayanganj town. After the construction of the building, a portion of the underground car park was unused, so he planned to have a mini cineplex there. The cineplex was built there after getting permission from the Mayor of Narayanganj City Corporation. It was scheduled to inaugurated in Eid-ul-Adha, 2019 (August). This 35-seat mini theater is operated jointly by City corporation authority and CineMaker, a film production studio. This 4K theater with Dolby 7.1 surround sound system shows 3D films. The theater has a coffee shop also. It was opened on September 20, 2019. The first film showed in the theater was Surja Dighal Bari. The mini theater was closed for a total of 14 months in 2020 and 2021 due to the COVID-19 pandemic.
