= Modhumita =

Movie theater in Bangladesh

- মধুমিতা
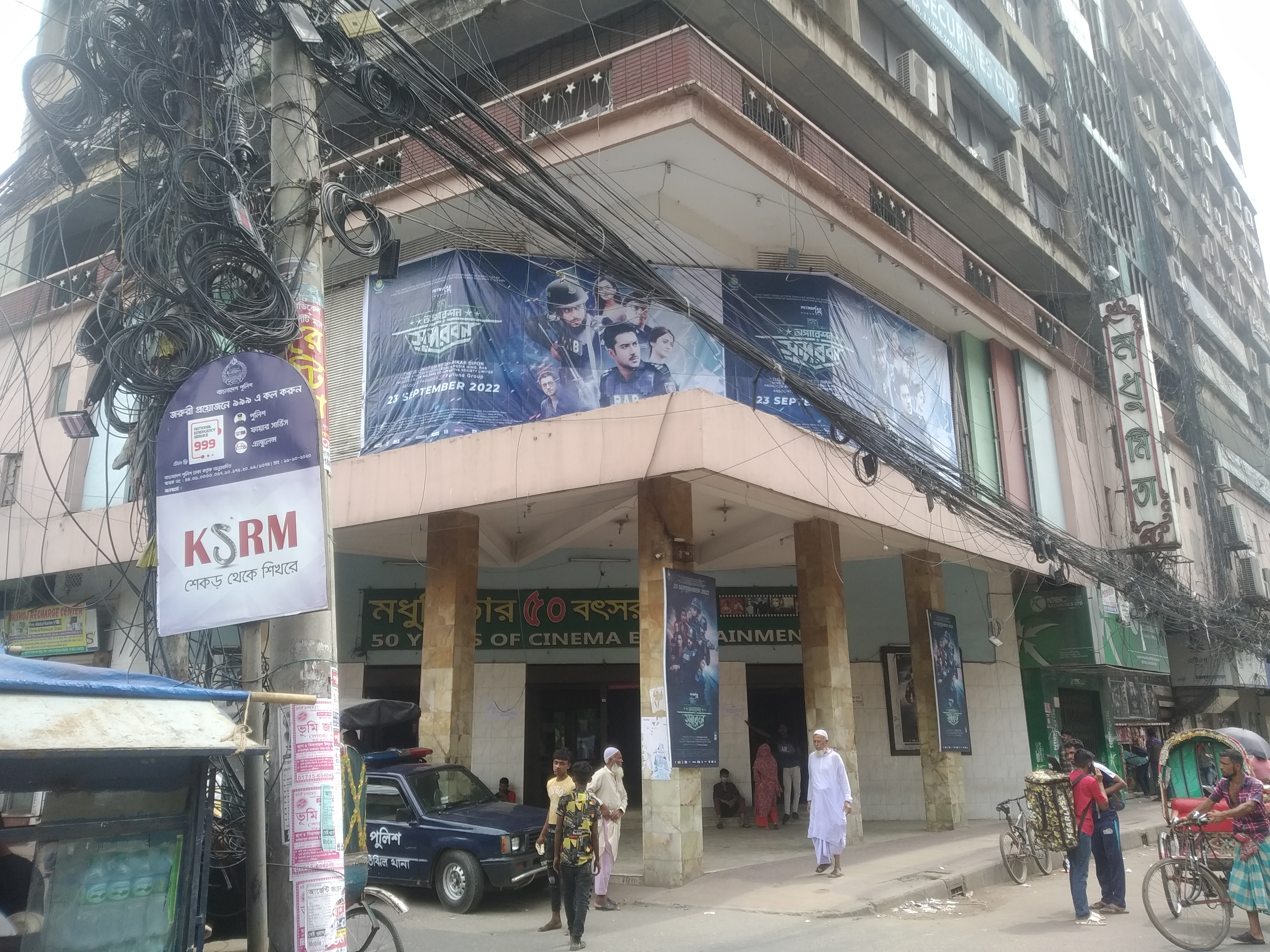
- Modhumita in 2022
- Interactive map of Modhumita
- Full name: Modhumita Movies
- Address: Motijheel; Dhaka; Bangladesh
- Location: 158/160 Motijheel Commercial Area
- Coordinates: 23.7228038°N 90.4218196°E
- Owner: Iftekhar Uddin Naushad
- Capacity: 1000
- Type: Movie theater
- Screen: 1

Construction
- Opened: 1 December 1967
- Closed: 17 March 2020
- Reopened: 15 October 2021

Modhumita is a movie theater located in Motijheel, Dhaka, Bangladesh. Modhumita Movies, one of the oldest movie theaters in the country, was closed on 17 March 2020 for COVID-19 epidemic, but reopened on 15 October 2021.

== History ==
The movie theater was founded by Siraj Uddin. He was a businessman from Dhaka, who owned a chemical factory. In 1967, the Bengali-language Indian film Mahanagar was screened in Balaka cinema hall in the city. As a movie enthusiast, Siraj desired to watch the film but failed to collect its ticket and stubbornly planned to build a movie theater. For the proposed name of the movie theater, he published an advertisement in The Daily Ittefaq. Many people sent names to him after seeing the advertisement. Among those names, he preferred the name "Modhumita" and offered a reward of Rs. 500 and a show ticket of the movie theater to whoever suggested this name. Abdul Jabbar Khan, the 6th Speaker of the National Assembly of Pakistan, inaugurated the movie theater on 1 December 1967.

The first film shown in Modhumita was Cleopatra, a 1963 American epic historical drama film. Then the movie theater was equipped with magnetic sound facility. The movie theater used fragrances from Otis Perfume House in Mitford, Dhaka. In 1981, the first International Film Festival in Bangladesh was inaugurated in this movie theater. The movie theater closed on 17 March 2020 due to the government-imposed lockdown due to the COVID-19 pandemic. As a result, the current owner of the movie theater, Iftekhar Uddin Naushad, faced monetary losses. However, he did not want to reopen Modhumita as he didn’t find anyone who wanted to release expensive films in such a situation. He decided to reopen the movie theater on 25 June 2021 and announced that Modhumita would screen Nabab LLB on that day but backed out from the decision for restrictions from the government. The movie theater was finally reopened on 15 October 2021 by showing the Bengali-language Indian film Baazi.

== Features ==
This movie theater has only one screen with 1000 seats. Here the seating system is divided into three parts. They are respectively known as dress circle, rear circle and middle circle. The movie theater has air conditioning, parking, toilets with Dolby Digital sound system. Modhumita has four shows daily. There is a facility to show 3D films.
