= Monihar =

Cinema hall in Bangladesh

Monihar Cinema Hall
- মণিহার সিনেমা হল
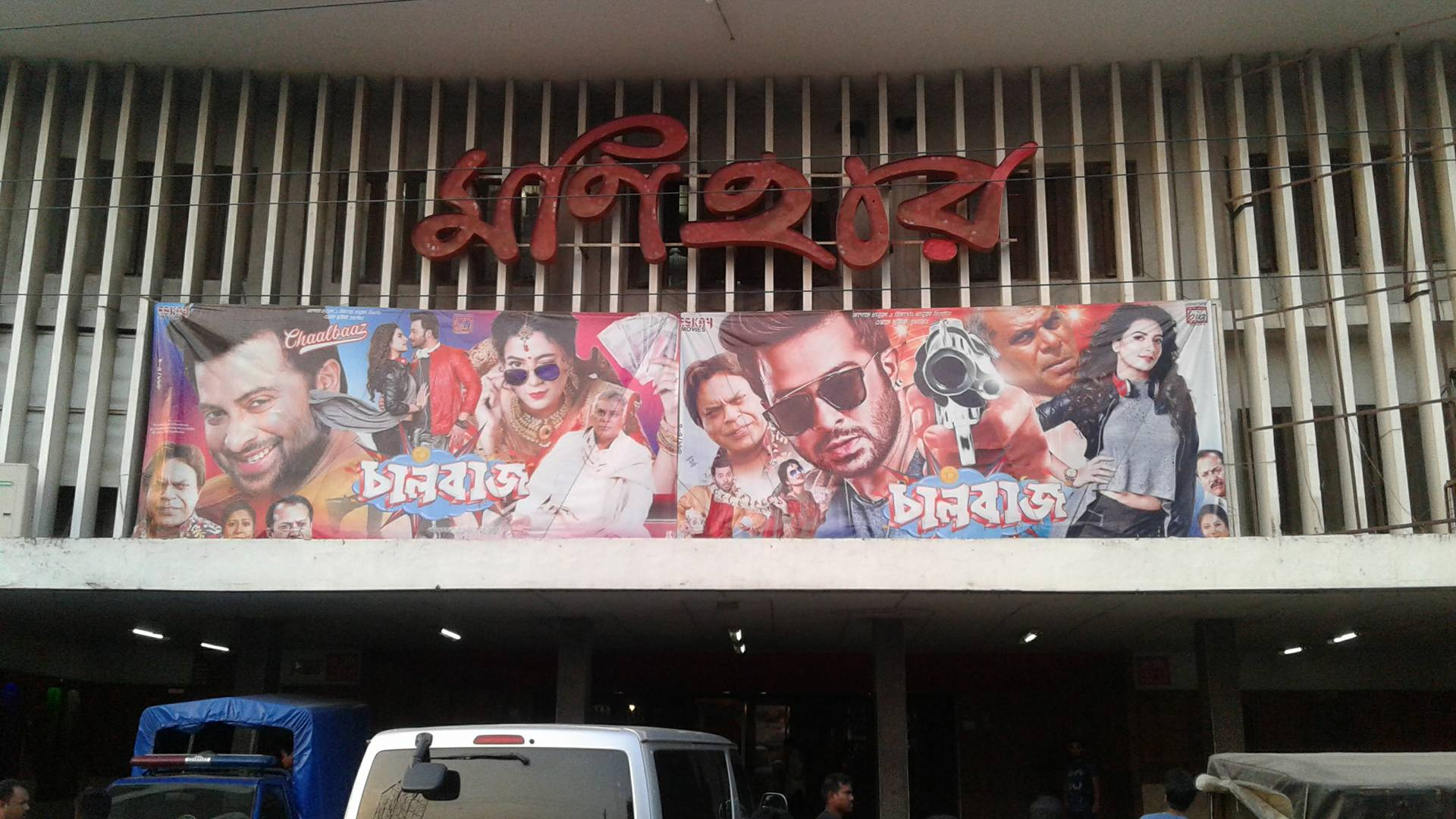
- Exterior of Monihar
- Interactive map of Monihar Cinema Hall
- Full name: Monihar Cinema Hall
- Address: Manihar Intersection, Jashore - Narail Highway, Jashore, Bangladesh
- Coordinates: 23.161205°N 89.222946°E
- Owner: Ziaul Islam Mithu
- Capacity: 1,430 (Main movie house) (With e-booking system for the dress circle); 66 (New mini theater) (With e-booking system)

Construction
- Opened: 8 December 1983
- Expanded: 15 November 2024
- Architect: Kazi Mohammad Hanif

Website
- www.moniharcinema.com

The Monihar Cinema Hall, or simply the Monihar (Bengali: মণিহার), is a movie theater located at Jessore district in Bangladesh. The main theater is an old-school single screen with a 1430 seat capacity, now a multiplex theater by adding a mini theater named "Monihar Cineplex" with 66 seats. The country's largest movie theater, Monihar was launched on 8 December 1983. Due to a construction style that was ahead of then era, the hall became popular within short time of its launch. Film lovers from different countries of the world including Japan, Korea, Africa, Australia, Russia and England came to watch movies. Monihar is widely considered as one of the most influential factors of Bangladeshi film industry.

== History ==
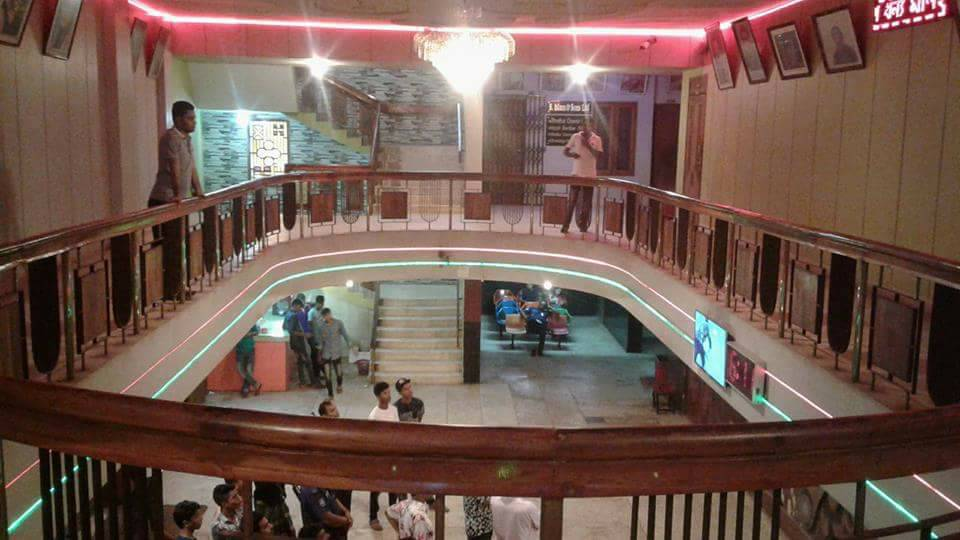
Inside Monihar Cinema Hall

Designed by Kazi Mohammad Hanif, the Cinema Hall used to be the main concentration of Dhallywood. Whenever a new film was about to get released, it was almost customary that the movie premiere should be held at Monihar. After its launch, the first movie to air in the hall was Director Dewan Nazrul's 'Johnny' starring Sohel Rana and Bobita.

=== Temporary closure in 2012 and reopen ===
For the first time in its history, Monihar's operation was terminated on 22 July 2012. The owner of the hall claimed that the closure of the building was due to continued attacks by mafias in the area and their extortion. Later, the hall got reopened after 20 days, upon the assurance of the administration and amidst the plight of the family members of the employees.

=== Financial crisis in recent years ===
However, the situation of the hall has not improved. Recently, the hall has fallen into a financial crisis. Previously, there were 100 people employed by the hall. The reduction in the workforce is due to a recession in the business. The 40 current employees are also in financial hardship. Not only the staff of the hall, but there are hundreds of jobs around Monihar that are at risk due to the lackluster performance of the hall.

=== Expanding into a multiplex ===
Recently, Monihar became the first multiplex theater in Jessore and in the whole Khulna Division. They recently opened their second screen, a 66-seat mini theater along with their original 1430-seat movie house. People can buy online tickets for watching movies in the "Monihar Cineplex" mini theater, but for the original "Monihar Cinema Theater," only dress circle tickets are available online, but for regular seat tickets, the only option is spot booking or buying tickets from the counter.

== Features ==
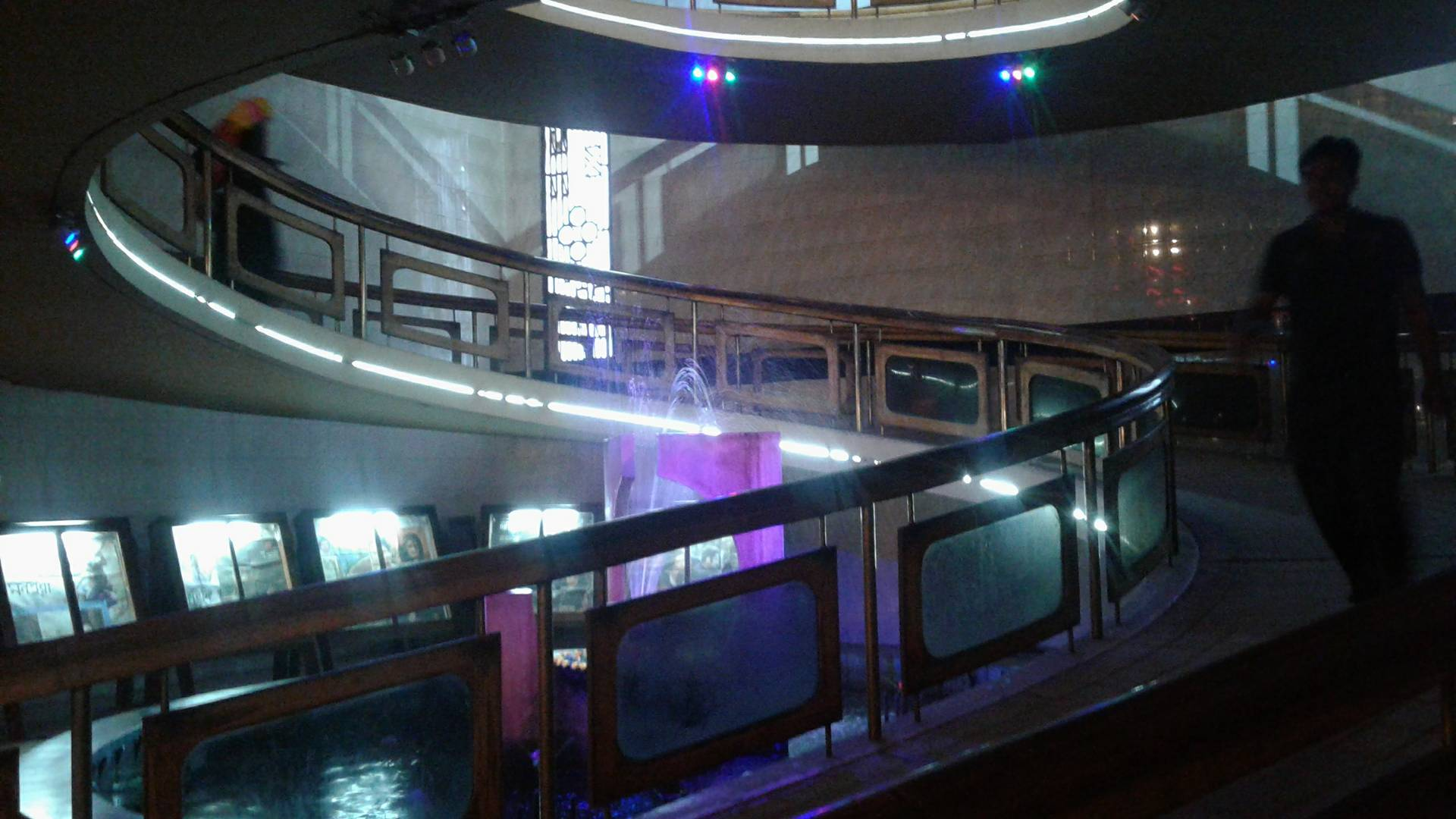
Spiral stairway inside Monihar

The number of seats in the movie hall of 4 bigha land is 1,400. Post construction of the hall was completed by an artist named Vishasa under the supervision of famous painter SM Sultan. The movie hall on the 4th floor is fully air-conditioned. There is a community center, a residential hotel and 40 shops inside Monihar. There are ram stairs, flashes, chandeliers etc. At present, Monihar employs 40 employees.

=== Type of cinemas ===
- Bangladeshi movies
- Hollywood movies
- Indo-Bangla joint venture movies
