= Azad (movie theater) =

Movie theater in Bangladesh

- আজাদ
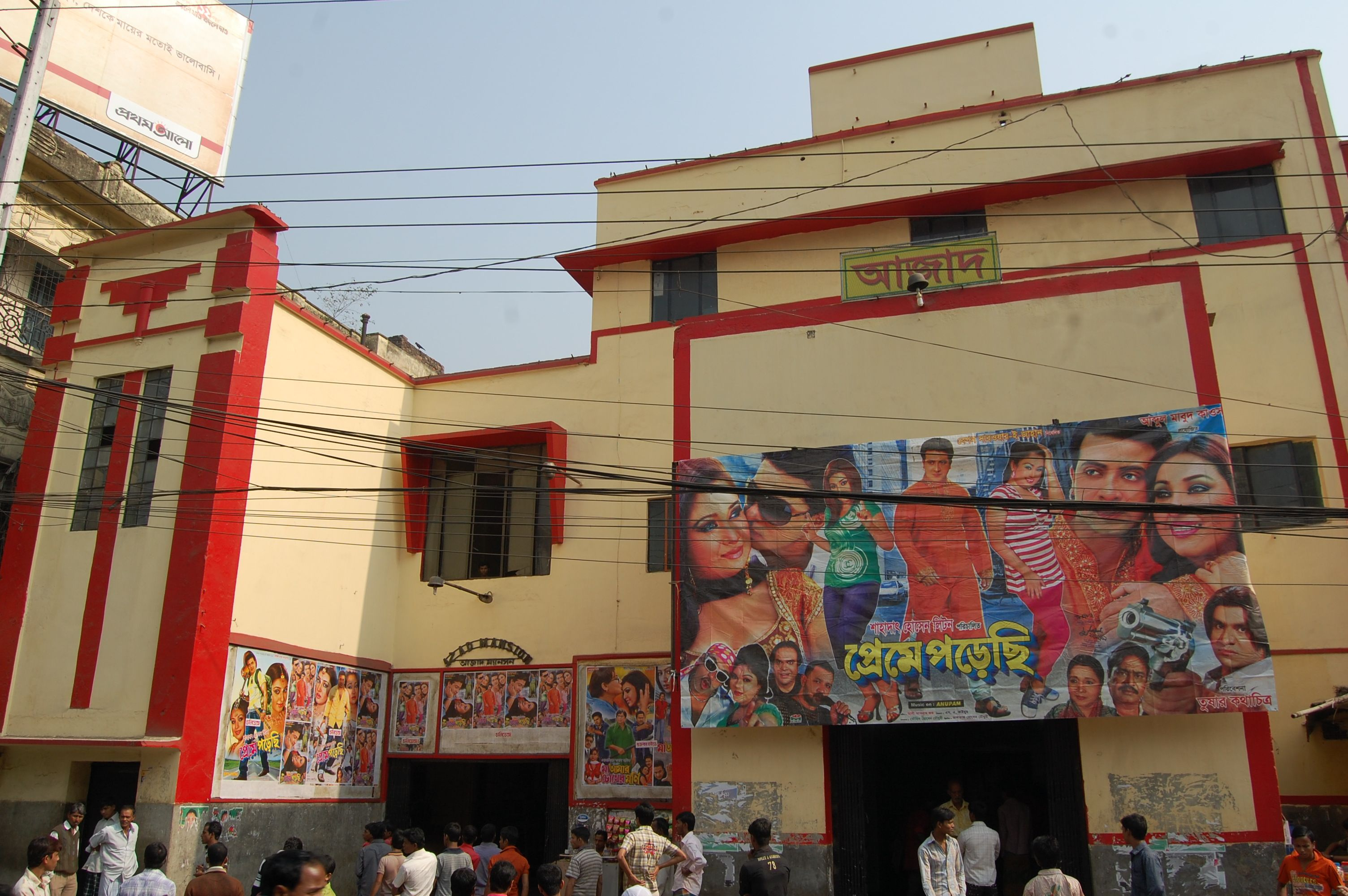
- Azad in 2010
- Interactive map of Azad
- Former names: Mukul Talkies (1929–1964)
- Address: Johnson Road; Dhaka; Bangladesh
- Coordinates: 23.7113°N 90.4097°E
- Owner: The Dhaka Picture Palace Limited
- Capacity: 1100
- Type: Movie theater
- Screen: 1

Construction
- Opened: 1929

Azad is a movie theater located in Johnson Road, Dhaka, Bangladesh. Azad is one of the oldest movie theaters and the fourth oldest movie theater in the capital of the country.

== History ==
In 1929, Mukul Banerjee, the then zamindar of Murapara, established a movie theater named "Mukul Talkies" in Old Dhaka. R. C. Majumdar, the then vice chancellors of Dhaka University, inaugurated the movie theater. On the opening day, Mukul Talkies screened the film The Last Kiss, which is said to be the first silent film produced in Dhaka. Yar Mohammad Khan rented Mukul Theatre to hold the Awami League council meeting in the early in 1950s. Mukul Talkies was renamed Azad Cinema in 1964 after it was bought by Sher Ali Ramji, a Bollywood film producer. Ten years later, the ownership of the movie theater was transferred to A.U.M. Khalilur Rahman. On 23 December 2013, a fire, caused by electric short circuit, broke out in the movie theater, destroying much of its furniture. The movie theater suffered during the COVID-19 pandemic and received an outstanding bill of ৳12 lakh.

== Features ==
Azad usually shows old films. It has 1100 seats. Azad has three shows daily.

== Controversy ==
Azad is popular for B-grade and perverted female objectified paraphilic film posters. Besides, there are allegations of involvement of drug addicts and people involved in anti-social activities with this movie theater. Its manager claimed that the posters were asked by the film distributors to put up. But he denied the second allegation.
