= Shyamoli Cinema =

Movie theater in Dhaka, Bangladesh

- শ্যামলী সিনেমা
- Former names: Shyamoli
- Address: Shyamoli Square Shopping Mall, Shyamoli; Dhaka; Bangladesh
- Coordinates: 23.7748°N 90.3655°E
- Owner: M.A. Gaffar
- Type: Movie theater
- Capacity: 306
- Screens: 1

Construction
- Opened: 26 March 1976
- Closed: 31 August 2007
- Reopened: 14 April 2014

Website
- shyamolicinema.com

Shyamoli Cinema is a movie theater located in Shyamoli, Mohammadpur Thana of Dhaka, the capital of Bangladesh. Originally the area was named "Shyamoli" after this theatre.

== History ==
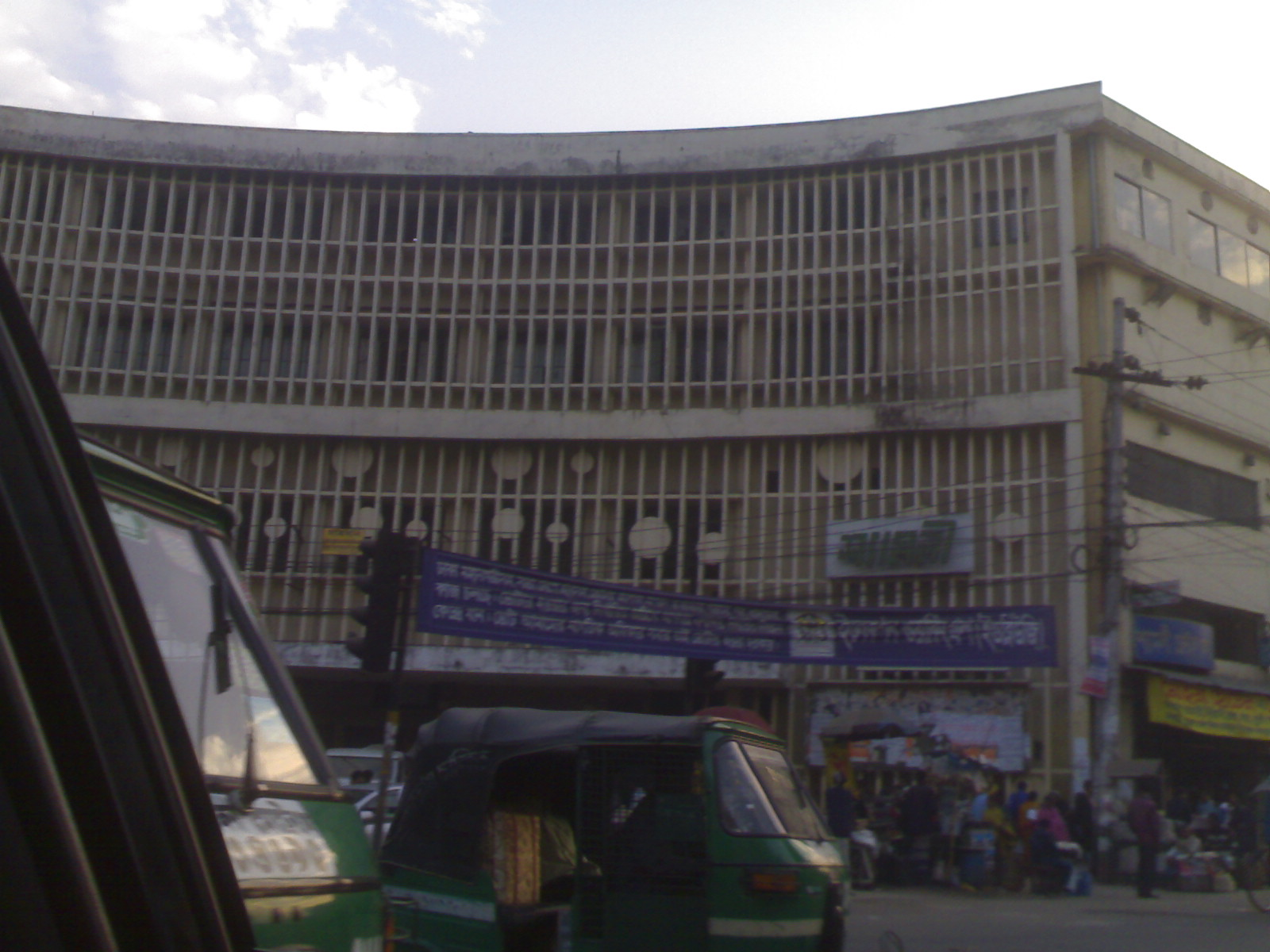
The old theater before demolishment

M.A. Gaffar opened Shyamoli Cinema Hall on 26 March 1976. The first film shown in this 1300-seat movie theater was Jaal Theke Jaala. On 31 August 2007, Shyamoli Cinema Hall closed because the building was being demolished and replaced with the high-rise Shyamoli Square Shopping Mall. At the initiative of M.A. Gaffar's five sons, the cinema reopened in the mall on 14 April 2014, screening Glow of the Firefly. Modern facilities were added to the movie theater and the number of seats was reduced to 306.
