= Sutter Street Railway =

Streetcar operator in San Francisco (1866–1902)

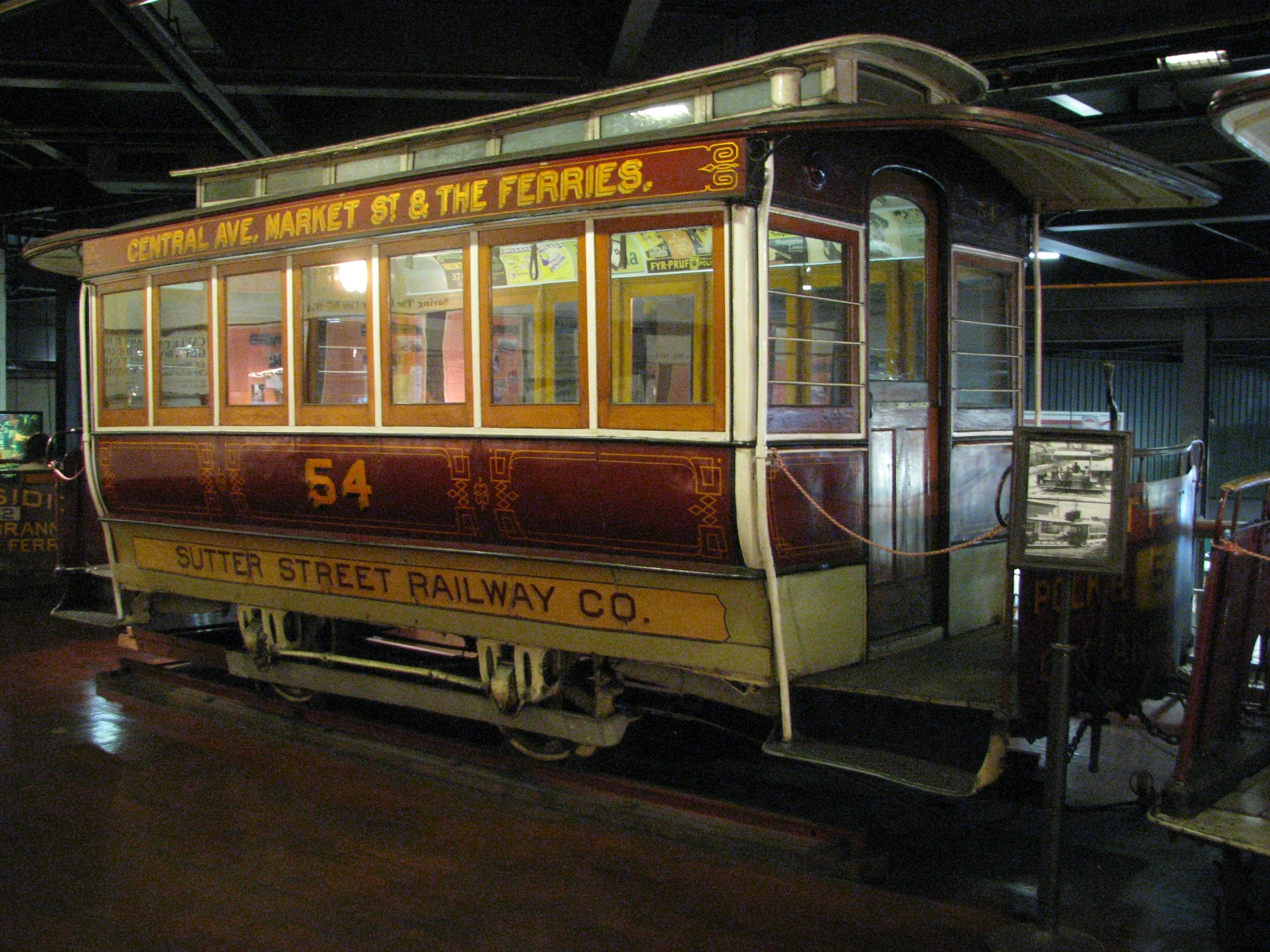
Sutter Street number 54 trailer car on display in the SF Cable Car Museum.

The Sutter Street Railway was a streetcar operator in San Francisco. Beginning service in 1866 as a horsecar line, the railroad would go on to convert to cable operation. It would go on to be largely consolidated into the United Railroads of San Francisco in 1902, though was maintained as a dummy corporation for several years.

== History ==
The railway began service as a traditional 3 ft 6 in (1,067 mm) horsecar route on May 1, 1866 as the Front Street, Mission and Ocean Railroad. Shortly after it had become known as the Sutter Street Railroad.

In 1877 the line from Sansome to Larkin was converted to cable car operation, widening the track gauge from 3 ft 6 in (1,067 mm) to 5 ft (1,524 mm). It was the second railway opened which was powered by continuous cable operation. The formal opening was on January 27, though service was spotty due to issues with cable stretching which required additional tension. When the cable was restarted four days later, a drum which carried the cable shattered and ceased service for several more days while a replacement was fabricated. While it needed to negotiate less of a grade than its predecessor Clay Street Hill Railroad, the company introduced two innovations, designed by Asa Hovey: the side grip and lever operation.

A new crosstown line was opened in 1878. It ran on Larkin from Bush to Hayes. This line eventually extended south along 9th to Brannan and north to Pacific, then west to Fillmore.

The railway purchased the Sutro Railroad shortly after its founding in 1896.

Sutter Street Railway was purchased by Patrick Calhoun's "Baltomore Syndicate" in 1901 and was largely amalgamated into the United Railroads of San Francisco, though the Sutter Street Line was maintained under the old Sutter Street Railway as a dummy corporation.

Horse cars were put in service again in San Francisco in June 1908, the first time they had been used since the 1906 San Francisco earthquake. This action followed the refusal of the Board of Supervisors to grant a permit to the Sutter Street Railroad to operate electric cars over the outer tracks on lower Market Street. The company had a franchise to operate horse cars over the outer tracks on the street but shortly after the fire a temporary permit was given to use electricity. From time to time that permit was renewed, but the permit expired that month and the Supervisors refused to renew it except on condition that the company pay $1,000 a month rental for the use of the line and in addition agree that a municipally owned road or a road yet to be built shall have the right to run over the same tracks. After years of litigation, the new Geary Municipal Railway was granted rights to operate on lower Market Street (pending completion of electrification) and Sutter cars were allowed to operate to the ferries under electric power for the line's full length. The final horsecar in San Francisco was driven down Market Street by Mayor James Rolph on June 3, 1913.

== Steam-powered extension ==
A 5-foot gauge extension was built through the Marina District to the Presidio of San Francisco in 1877. Former horsecars were pulled over this line by two 0-4-0 tank locomotives built by Baldwin Locomotive Works (C/N 4121 & 4125). These steam dummy locomotives were named Harbor View and Casebolt. After the extension was sold to the Presidio & Ferries Railway in 1880, these locomotives operated as numbers 1 and 2 until the line was destroyed by the San Francisco earthquake.

== Rolling stock ==
Sutter Street Railway operated the unique "balloon car", devised by Henry Casebolt. The car was built with a central pivot point; at the end of a run, the horse would run a circle around the vehicle's base, turning the compartment in a circle until it was reversed and ready for a return trip.

Sutter Street Railway's grip car 46 and trailer 54 have been preserved and are displayed in the San Francisco Cable Car Museum.

== See also ==
- San Francisco cable car system
