= Andrew Smith Hallidie =

American railway entrepreneur who conceived of the San Francisco cable car system

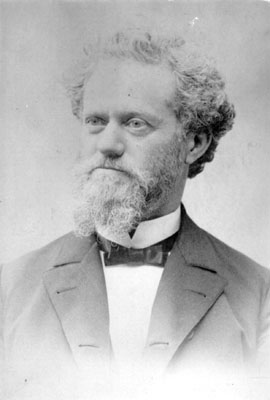
- Born: Andrew Smith; March 16, 1836; London, England
- Died: April 24, 1900 (aged 64); San Francisco, California, US
- Occupation: promoter of the Clay Street Hill Railroad
- Known for: Inventing the cable car and father of the present day San Francisco cable car system
- Relatives: Andrew Hallidie (uncle)

Andrew Smith Hallidie (March 16, 1836 – April 24, 1900) was an American entrepreneur who was the promoter of the Clay Street Hill Railroad in San Francisco. This was the world's first practical cable car system, and Hallidie is often therefore regarded as the inventor of the cable car and father of the present day San Francisco cable car system, although both claims are open to dispute. He also introduced the manufacture of wire rope to California, and at an early age was a prolific builder of bridges in the Californian interior.

== Early life ==
Andrew Smith Hallidie was born Andrew Smith, later adopting the name Hallidie in honor of his uncle, Sir Andrew Hallidie. His birthplace is variously quoted as London in the United Kingdom. His mother, Julia Johnstone Smith, was from Lockerbie, Dumfriesshire and his father, Andrew Smith (a prolific inventor in his own right, responsible for inventing the first box door spring, a floor cramp and had an early patent for wire rope) was born in Fleming, Dumfriesshire, Scotland, in 1798.

At age 13 the younger Smith was initially apprenticed to a machine shop and drawing office operated by his older brother Archibald. In 1852 at age 16 father and son sailed for California, where the father had an interest in some gold mines in Mariposa County. These proved disappointing, and the father returned to England in 1853. The son, however, remained in California, and became a gold miner whilst also working as a blacksmith, surveyor and builder of bridges.

In 1856, while working on the construction of a flume at a mine at American Bar, Hallidie was consulted over the rapid rate of wear on the ropes used to lower cars of rock from the mine to the mill. These ropes were wearing out in 75 days. Hallidie improvised machinery to make a replacement wire rope to his father's design, which lasted two years, and in the process began wire rope manufacture in California.

== Wire rope and bridges ==
Hallidie abandoned mining in 1857 and returned to San Francisco. Under the name of A. S. Hallidie & Co., he began manufacturing wire rope in a building at Mason and Chestnut Streets, using the machinery from American Bar.

Hallidie was also heavily involved in bridge building: from 1861 to 1862, he constructed bridges across the Klamath River at Weitchpeck, at Nevada City, across the American River at Folsom, and across the Bear, Trinity, Stanislaus, and Tuolumne Rivers. In 1863, he built a bridge across the Fraser River, 10 miles (16 km) upstream of Yale at Alexandra in British Columbia.

Also in 1863, Hallidie married Martha Elizabeth Woods. They had no children. The following year, he became a US citizen, and in 1865, he gave up bridge building and devoted himself entirely to his wire rope manufacturing business, which was experiencing increased demand from silver mines on the Comstock Lode.

In 1867, Hallidie invented the Hallidie ropeway, a form of aerial tramway used for transporting ore and other materials across mountainous districts, which he successfully installed in a number of locations and later patented.

== Cable cars ==
Accounts differ as to exactly how involved Hallidie was in the inception of the Clay Street Hill Railway. One version has him taking over the promotion of the line when the original promoter, Benjamin Brooks, failed to raise the necessary capital. In another version, Hallidie was the instigator, inspired by a desire to reduce the suffering incurred by the horses that hauled streetcars up Jackson Street, from Kearny to Stockton Street.

There is also doubt as to when exactly the first run of the cable car occurred. The franchise required the first run no later than August 1, 1873, but at least one source reports that the run took place a day late, on August 2, although the city chose not to void the franchise. Some accounts say that the first gripman hired by Hallidie looked down the steep hill from Jones and refused to operate the car, so Hallidie took the grip himself and ran the car down the hill and up again without any problems.

The named engineer of the Clay Street line was William Eppelsheimer. However, Hallidie's previous experience of cables and cable haulage systems make it likely that he contributed to the design of the system.

The Clay Street line started regular service on September 1, 1873, and was a financial success. In addition, Hallidie's patents on the cable car design were stringently enforced on cable car promoters around the world and made him a rich man.

== Other activities ==
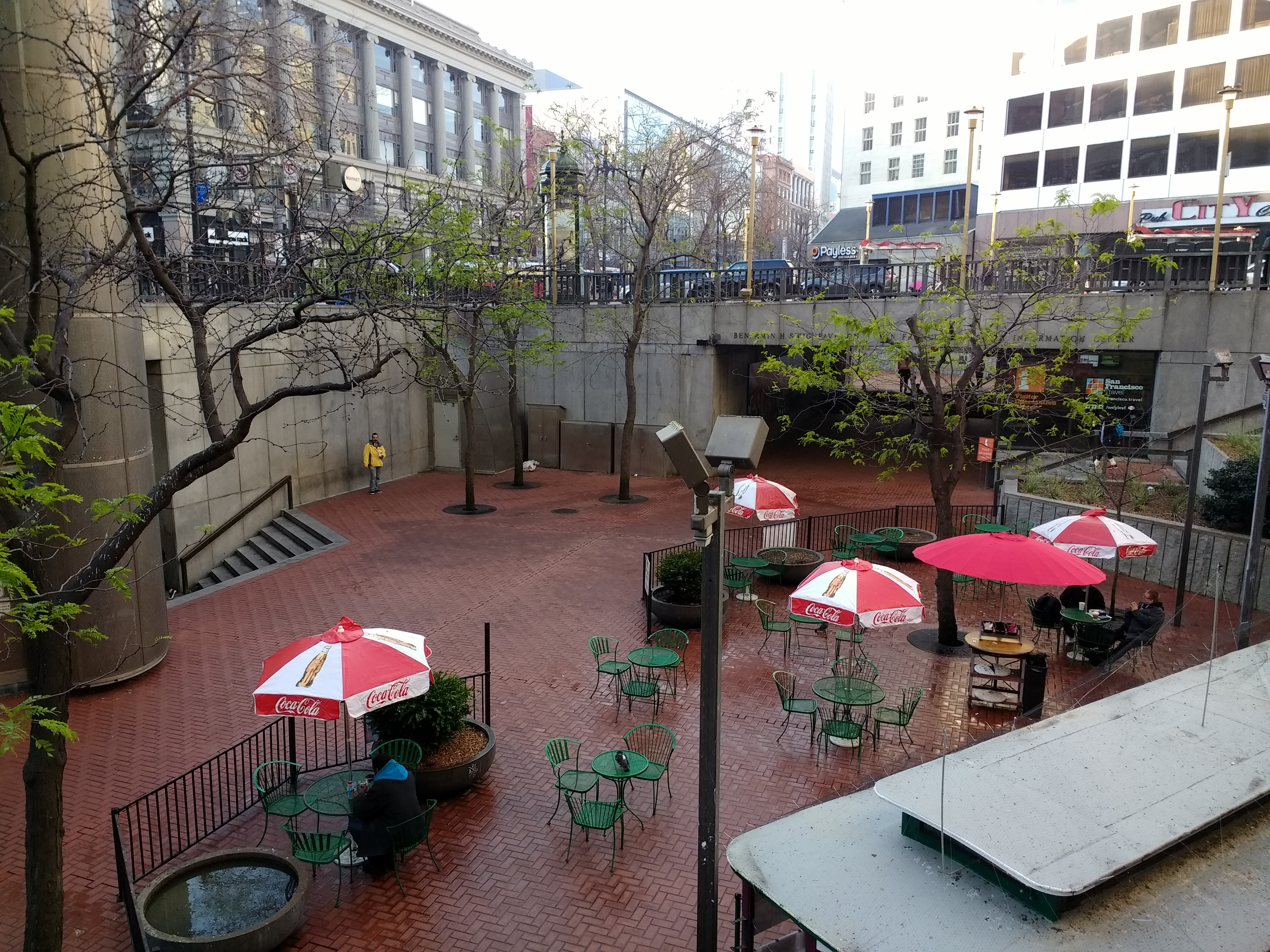
Hallidie Plaza in San Francisco is named after Andrew Smith Hallidie

Hallidie occupied many positions in San Francisco society. He served as a regent of the University of California from 1868 until his death, and as a trustee and vice-president of the San Francisco Mechanics Institute in 1864 and president from 1868 to 1877 and from 1893 to 1895. In 1873, Hallidie stood for election to the California State Senate, and in 1875 he stood for election as mayor of San Francisco, but in both cases, he was defeated.

Hallidie served as a trustee of the First Unitarian Church, and as its moderator in 1883 and 1884. He held memberships in the American Society of Inventors, American Geographical Society, California Academy of Sciences, and other scientific and literary bodies. He was a member of the old California Historical Society and of the Pacific-Union, Olympic, and Sierra clubs.

A. S. Hallidie & Co. became the California Wire Works in 1883 with Hallidie as president. In 1895, it was sold to Washburn and Moen Co., the oldest manufacturers of wire in the United States (established in 1831).

== Death and legacy ==
Hallidie died on April 24, 1900, at the age of 64 of heart disease at his San Francisco residence. He was buried at Laurel Hill Cemetery, and his remains were moved to Cypress Lawn Memorial Park in Colma, California by 1941.

In San Francisco, Hallidie Plaza (near the Powell and Market Street cable car turntable) and the Hallidie Building (an office building in the city's Financial District) are named after him.
