= San Francisco Cable Car Museum =

Railway museum in California, US

Cable Car Museum

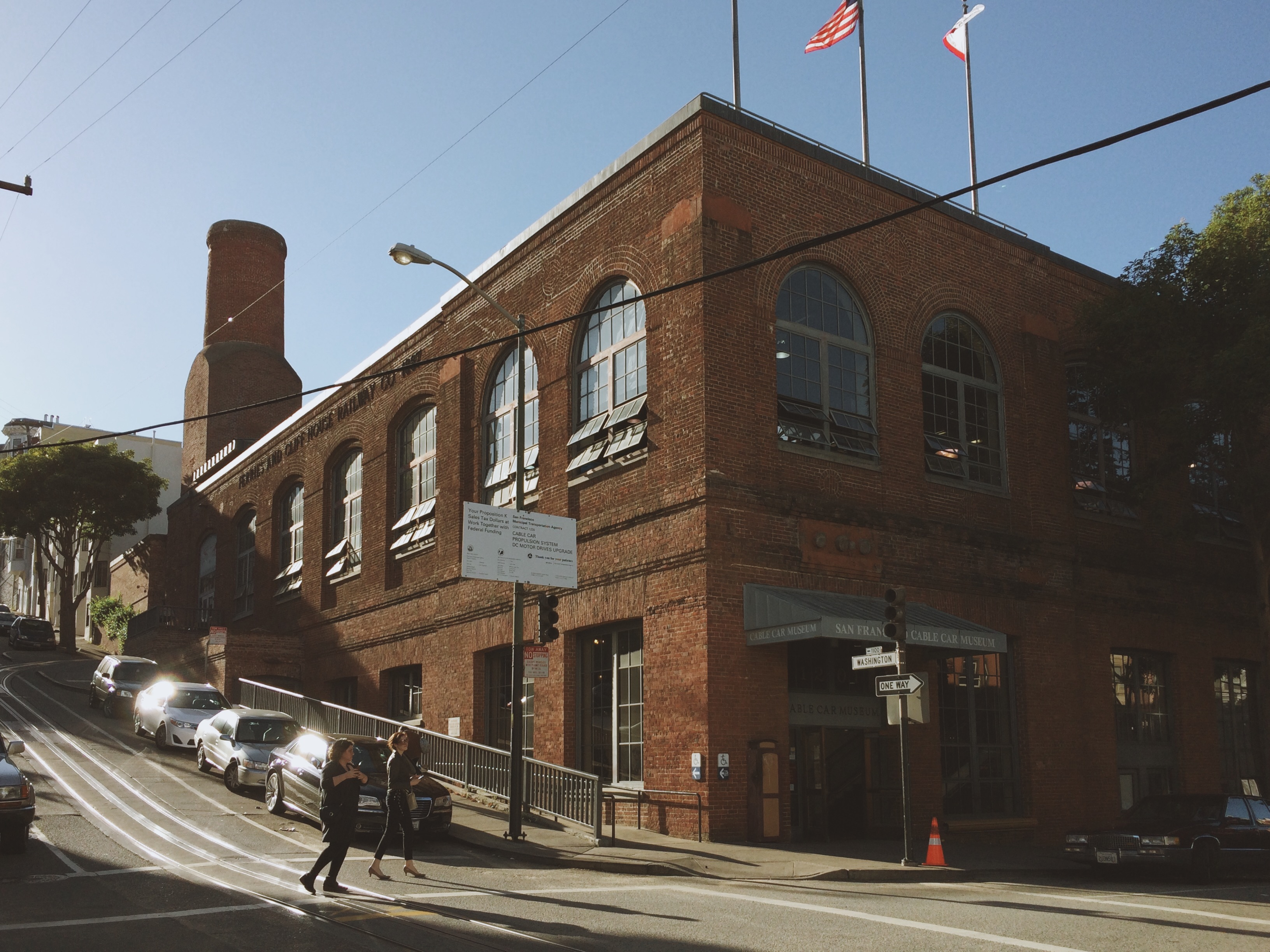
- Exterior of the Ferries and Cliff House Railway Co. building which was constructed in 1887 and houses the cable car winding station, motors, and museum. The smoke stack in the rear was damaged in the 1906 San Francisco earthquake, restored then soon decommissioned when steam power was replaced with electrical power at the winding station.

- Location within San Francisco Location within California Location within the United States
- Established: 1853
- Location: 1201 Mason Street; San Francisco, California, US
- Coordinates: 37.794675°N 122.411396°W
- Type: Railway museum
- Website: cablecarmuseum.org

The Cable Car Museum is a free museum in the Nob Hill neighborhood of San Francisco, California. Located at 1201 Mason Street, it contains historical and explanatory exhibits on the San Francisco cable car system, which can itself be regarded as a working museum.

== Exhibits ==
The museum contains several preserved cable cars, together with smaller exhibits and a gift shop. The cable cars displayed include:

- Sutter Street Railway - grip car 46 and trailer 54 dating from the 1870s
- Clay Street Hill Railroad - grip car 8, the only surviving car from the first cable car company

The museum is part of the complex that also houses the cable car power house, which drives the cables, and the car depot ("barn"). The car depot is not open to the public, but two galleries allow visitors to view the power house from above, and to descend below the junction of Washington and Mason streets to view the large cavern where the haulage cables are routed via large sheaves out to the street.

The museum was established in 1974, and is run by the Friends of the Cable Car Museum.

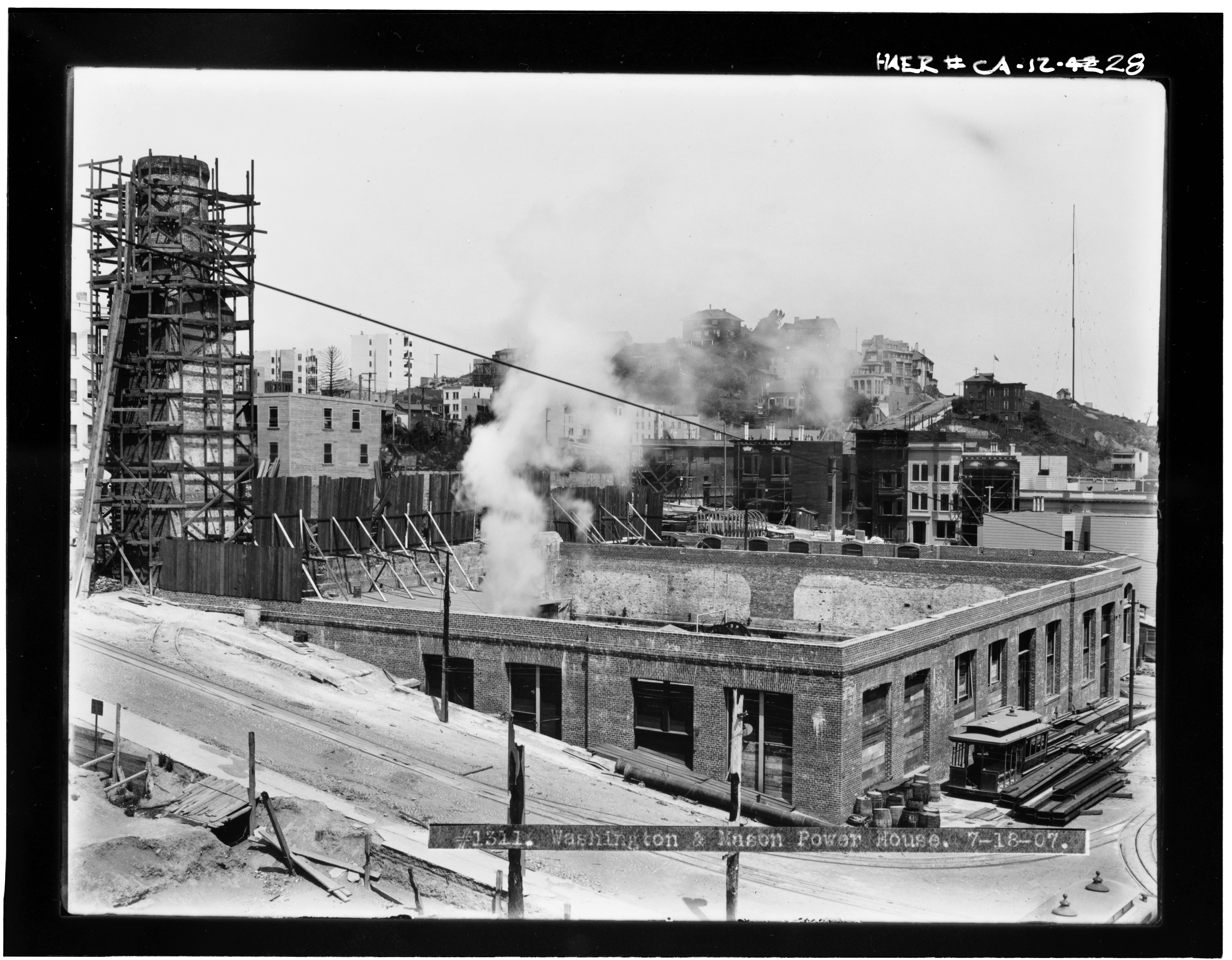
Reconstruction of powerhouse (July 1907)

Layout of Cable Car Museum; primary exhibit space is on the northwest mezzanine level

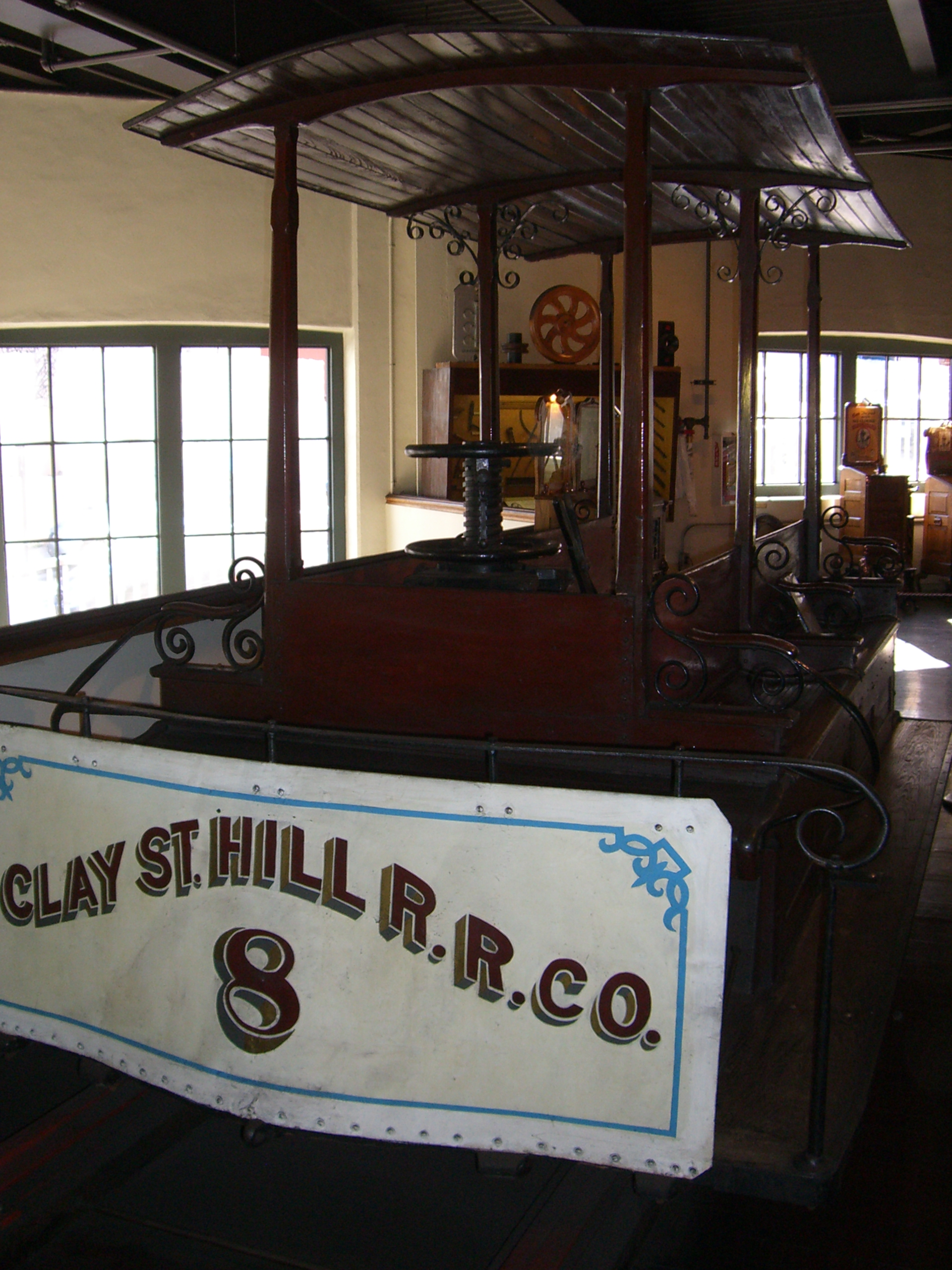
Preserved Clay Street Hill Railroad No. 8

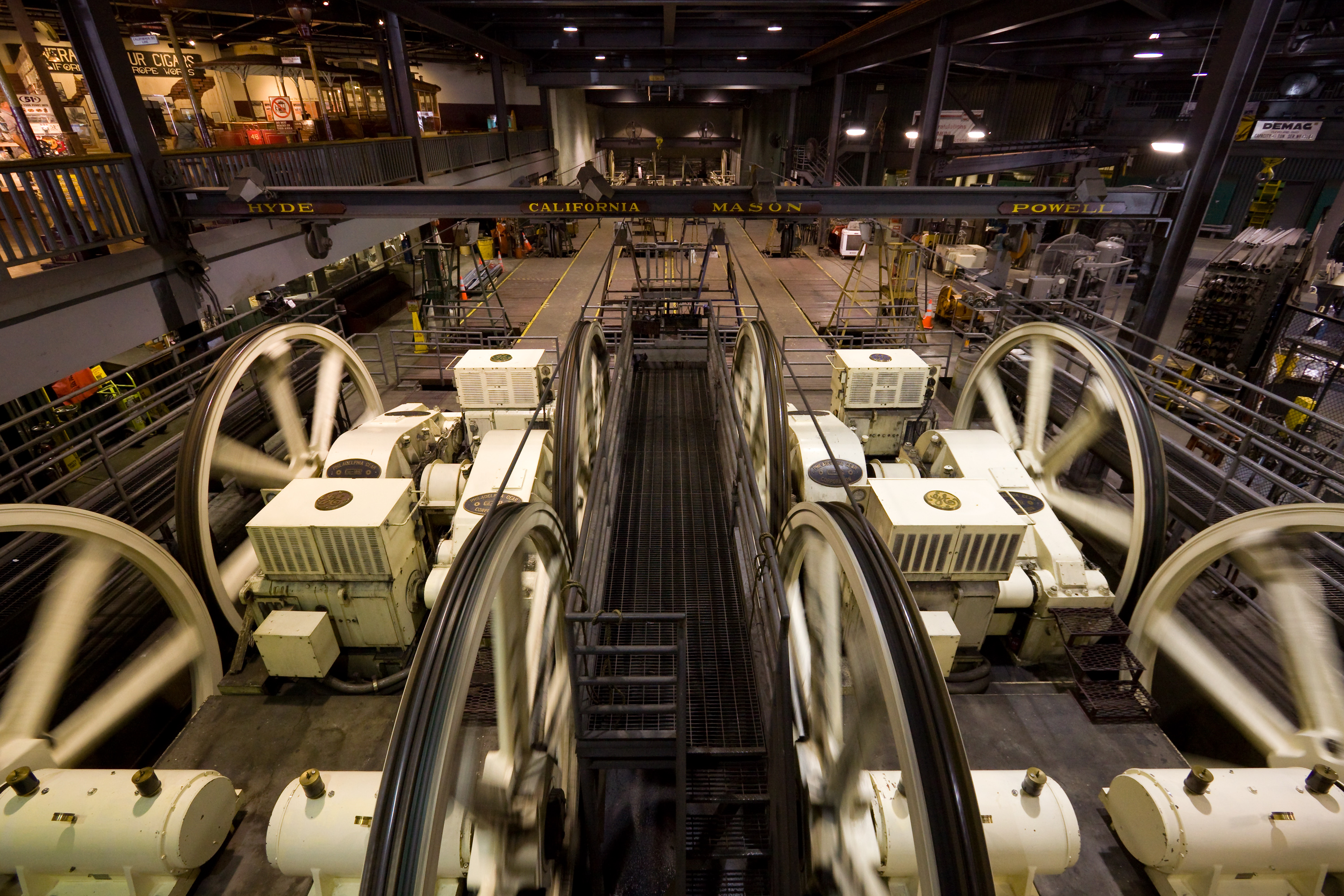
Motors and winding wheels; the signs above each cable ("Hyde", "California", "Mason", and "Powell") show which line it is driving.

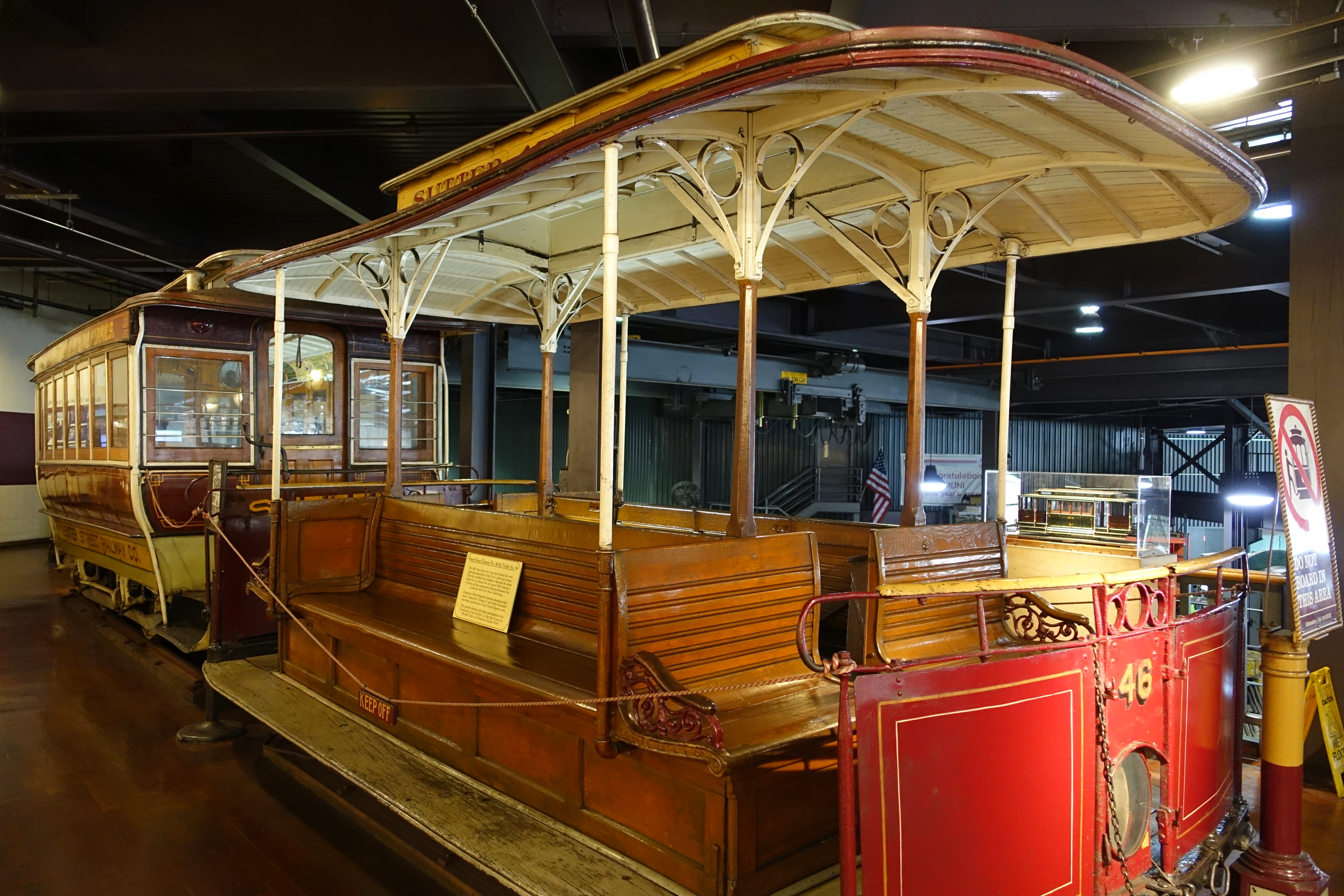
Preserved Sutter Street Railway No. 46 and 54

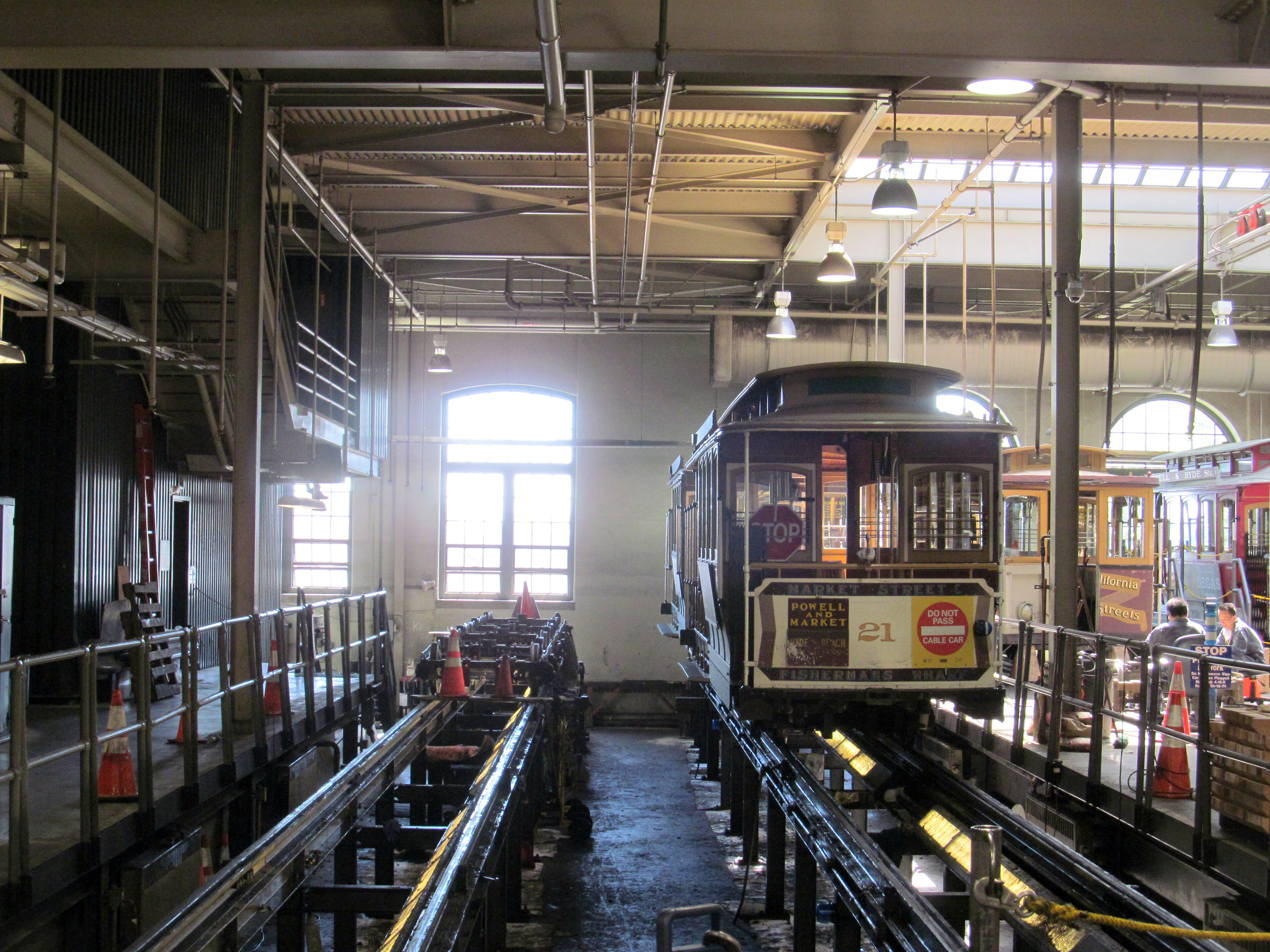
Car depot (car barn)
