= San Francisco cable car system =

Historic cable car system in San Francisco, California

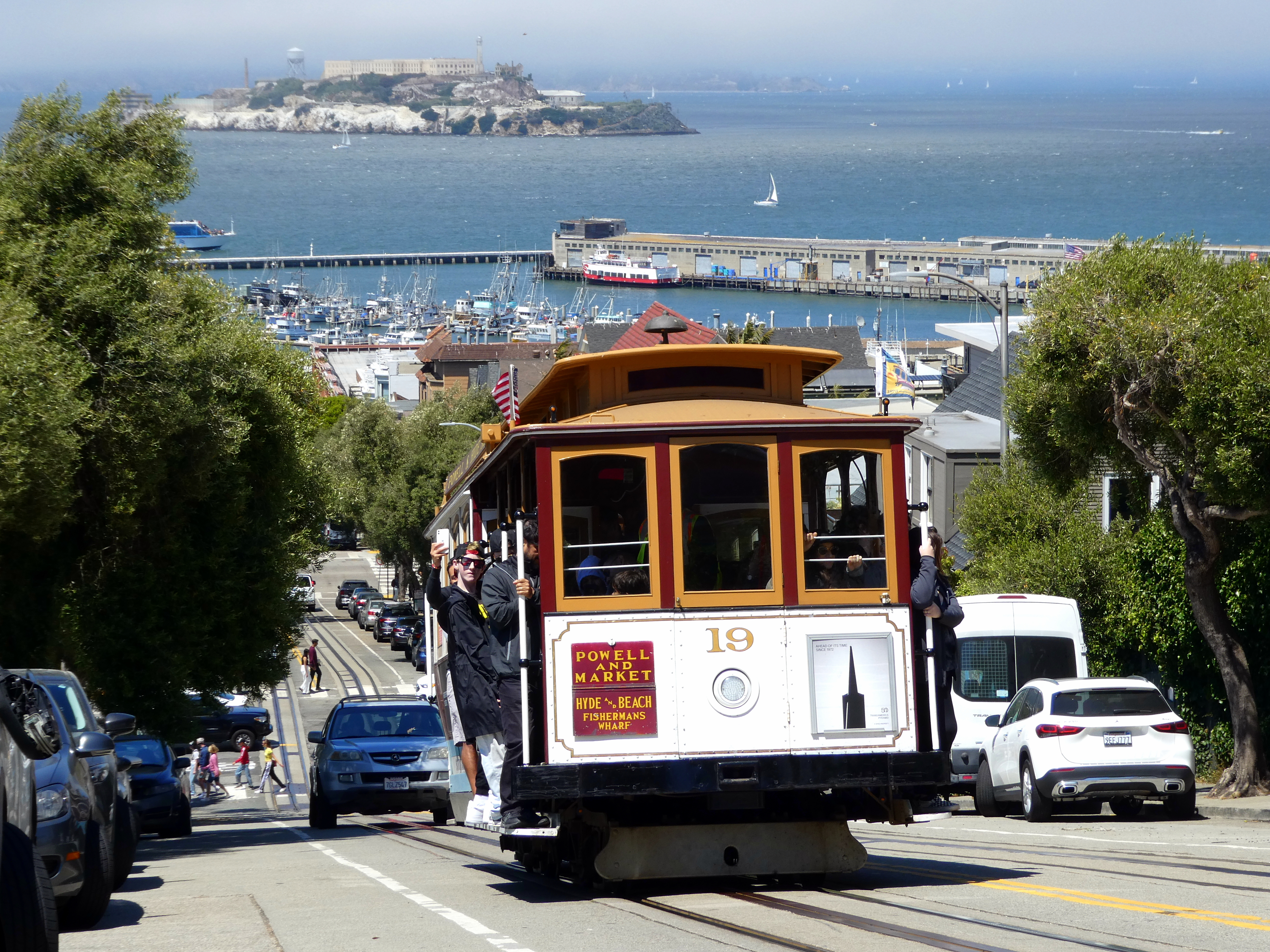
- Cable car on Hyde Street in 2023, with Alcatraz Island and Fisherman's Wharf in the background

Overview
- Owner: San Francisco Municipal Transportation Agency
- Area served: Chinatown, Embarcadero, Financial District, Fisherman's Wharf, Nob Hill, North Beach, Russian Hill, Union Square
- Locale: San Francisco
- Transit type: Cable car
- Number of lines: 3
- Line number: 59/PM (Powell–Mason line); 60/PH (Powell–Hyde line); 61/C (California St. line)
- Number of stations: 62
- Daily ridership: 8,200 (weekdays, Q2 2026)
- Annual ridership: 5,719,900 (2019)
- Headquarters: San Francisco Cable Car Museum
- Website: sfmta.com/cablecars

Operation
- Began operation: California St. line: 1878; Powell–Mason line: 1888; Powell–Hyde line: 1957
- Operator: San Francisco Municipal Railway
- Character: Street running with some reserved right-of-ways
- Number of vehicles: California St. line: 12 double-ended cars; Powell–Mason/Hyde lines: 28 single-ended cars

Technical
- System length: California St. line: 1.4 mi (2.3 km); Powell–Mason line: 1.6 mi (2.6 km); Powell–Hyde line: 2.1 mi (3.4 km)
- No. of tracks: 2
- Track gauge: 3 ft 6 in (1,067 mm)
- Top speed: 9.5 mph (15.3 km/h)
- San Francisco Cable Cars
- U.S. National Register of Historic Places
- U.S. National Historic Landmark
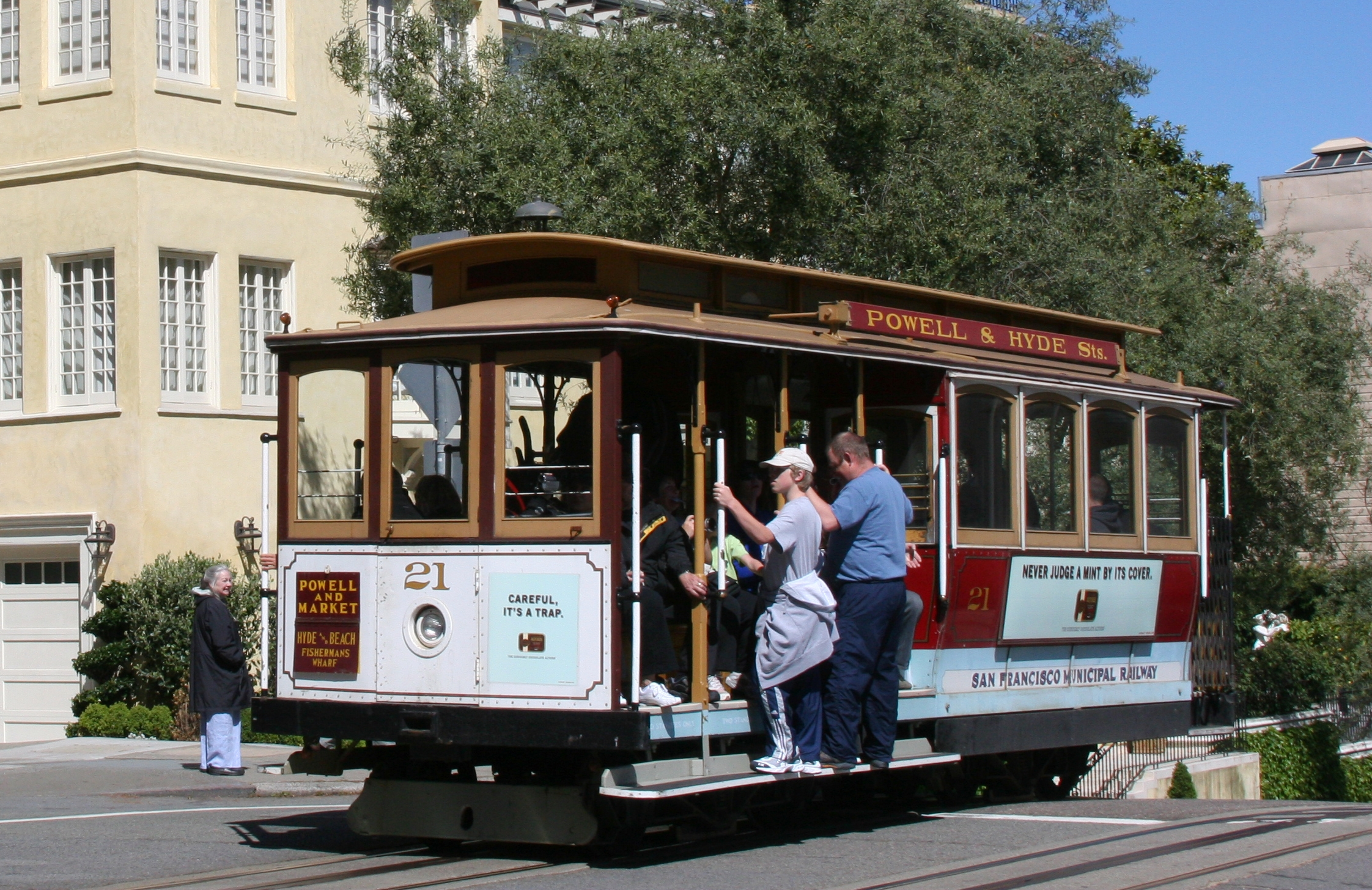
- Powell–Hyde cable car crossing Lombard Street on Russian Hill
- Location: 1201 Mason Street, San Francisco (car barn)
- Coordinates: 37°47′44″N 122°24′27″W
- Built: 1873
- Architect: Andrew Smith Hallidie
- NRHP reference No.: 66000233

Significant dates
- Added to NRHP: October 15, 1966
- Designated NHL: January 29, 1964
System map

The San Francisco cable car system is the world's last manually operated cable car system and an icon of the city of San Francisco, California. The system forms part of the intermodal urban transport network operated by the San Francisco Municipal Railway, which also includes the separate E Embarcadero and F Market & Wharves heritage streetcar lines, the Muni Metro modern light rail system, and bus routes operated by the San Francisco Municipal Railway, and operates alongside the Bay Area Rapid Transit system. Of the 23 cable car lines established between 1873 and 1890, only three remain (one of which combines parts of two earlier lines): two routes from downtown near Union Square to Fisherman's Wharf, and a third route along California Street.

While the cable cars are used to a certain extent by commuters, the vast majority of the millions of passengers who use the system every year are tourists, and as a result, the wait to get on can often reach two hours or more. They are among the most significant tourist attractions in the city, along with Alcatraz Island, the Golden Gate Bridge, and Fisherman's Wharf.

San Francisco's cable cars are listed on the National Register of Historic Places; the system is one of only two street railways to be named a National Historic Landmark, along with the St. Charles Streetcar Line in New Orleans.

== History ==
=== Beginnings ===
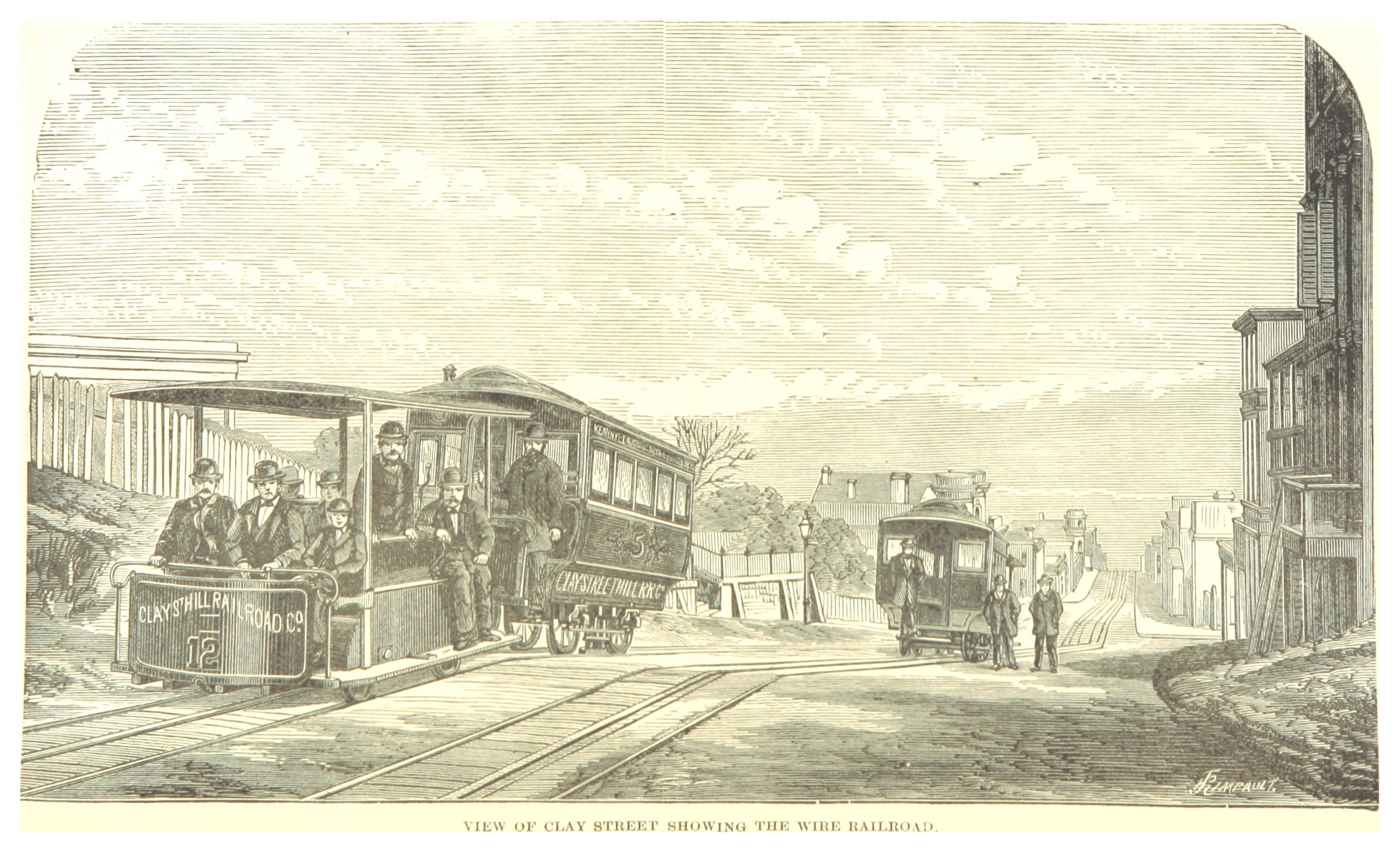
The Clay Street Hill Railroad in its early years

In 1869, Andrew Smith Hallidie had the idea for a cable car system in San Francisco, reportedly after witnessing an accident in which a horsecar riding over wet cobblestones slid backwards, killing the horses. Hallidie solicited financial support in 1871 and 1872, and his primary backers were Henry L. Davis, Joseph Britton, and James Moffit.

The first successful cable-operated street running train in the city was the Clay Street Hill Railroad, which had its inaugural run on August 2, 1873. The promoter of the line was Hallidie, and the engineer was William Eppelsheimer; both Hallidie and Eppelsheimer obtained several patents for their work on the Clay Street line. (Note: Hallidie's suite of patents relating to cable hauled railways included: No. 100,140 (Feb 22, 1870); No. 120,690 (Jun 11, 1872); No. 163,865 (Jun 1, 1875); No. 176,136 (Apr 18, 1876); No. 179,016 (Jun 20, 1876); No. 179,786 (Jul 11, 1876); No. 181,817 (Sep 5, 1876); No. 182,663 (Sep 26, 1876); No. 183,928 (Oct 31, 1876); No. 183,929 (Oct 31, 1876); No. 184,624 (Nov 21, 1876); No. 195,372 (Sep 18, 1877); No. 195,504 (Sep 25, 1877); No. 195,505 (Sep 25, 1877); Reissue No. 7,339 (Oct 10, 1876); Reissue No. 7,607 (Apr 17, 1877)) (Note: One of Eppelsheimer's contemporary patents was US160757.) The line involved the use of grip cars, which carried the grip that engaged with the cable, towing trailer cars; the design was the first to use grips. The term "grip" became synonymous with the operator.

The line started regular service on September 1, 1873, and its success led it to become the template for other cable car transit systems. It was a financial success, and Hallidie's patents were enforced on other cable car promoters, making him wealthy.

Accounts differ as to the precise degree of Hallidie's involvement in the inception of the line, and to the exact date on which it first ran. According to the franchise granted by the city, operations were required to begin by August 1, 1873. A retrospective published in 1895 stated that a single car was run over the line at 4 am on the morning of August 1 with few witnesses to ensure the franchise would not expire. Eppelsheimer would later bring a suit against Hallidie and the Clay Street Hill RR in June 1877 over patents, but dismissed it voluntarily the following March.

=== Expansion ===
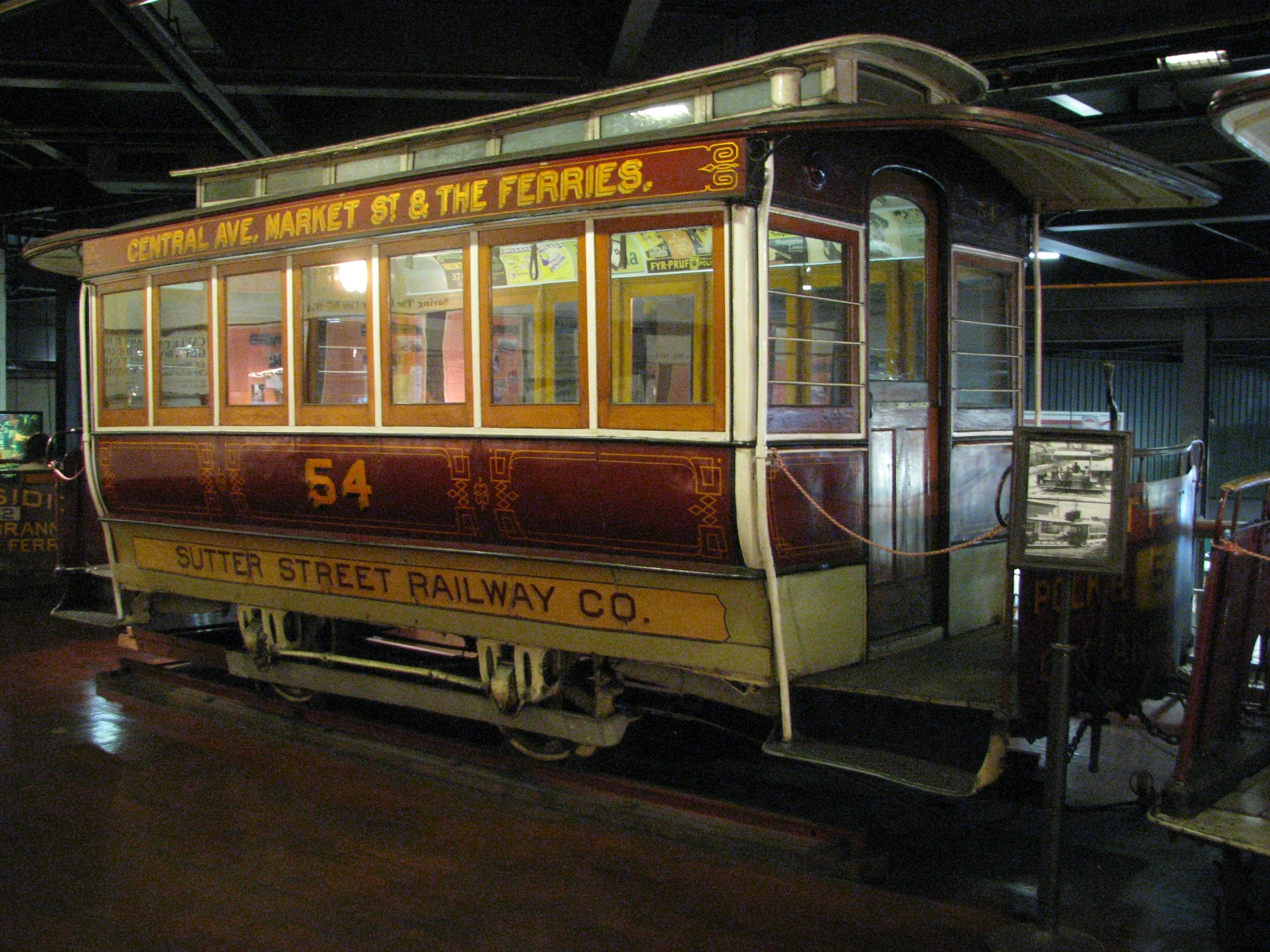
A preserved Sutter Street Railway car

The next cable car line to open was the Sutter Street Railway, which converted from horse operation in January 1877. This line introduced the side grip, and lever operation, both designed by Henry Casebolt and his assistant Asa Hovey, and patented by Casebolt. This idea came about because Casebolt did not want to pay Hallidie royalties of $50,000 a year for the use of his patent. The side grip allowed cable cars to cross at intersections.

In 1878, Leland Stanford opened his California Street Cable Railroad (Cal Cable). This company's first line was on California Street, and is the oldest cable car line still in operation. In 1880, the Geary Street, Park & Ocean Railway began operation. The Presidio and Ferries Railway followed two years later, and was the first cable company to include curves on its routes. The curves were "let-go" curves, in which the car drops the cable and coasts around the curve on its own momentum.

In 1883, the Market Street Cable Railway opened its first line. This company was controlled by the Southern Pacific Railroad and would grow to become San Francisco's largest cable car operator. At its peak, it operated five lines, all of which converged on Market Street to a common terminus at the Ferry Building. During rush hours, cars left that terminus every 15 seconds.

In 1888, the Ferries and Cliff House Railway opened its initial two-line system. The Powell–Mason line is still operated on the same route today; their other route was the Powell–Washington–Jackson line, stretches of which are used by today's Powell–Hyde line. The Ferries & Cliff House Railway was also responsible for the building of a car barn and powerhouse at Washington and Mason, and this site is still in use today. In the same year, it also purchased the original Clay Street Hill Railway, which it incorporated into a new Sacramento–Clay line in 1892.

In 1889, the Omnibus Railroad and Cable Company became the last new cable car operator in San Francisco. The following year the California Street Cable Railroad opened two new lines, these being the last entirely new cable car lines built in the city. One of them was the O'Farrell–Jones–Hyde line, the Hyde section of which still remains in operation as part of the current Powell–Hyde line.

In all, twenty-three lines were established between 1873 and 1890.

Eight original cable car companies
Name	Lines	Gauge	Grip	Start	End	Notes
Clay Street Hill Railroad	1	3 ft 6 in (1,067 mm)	bottom	Sep 1873	Sep 1888	Original route along Clay from Kearny to Leavenworth; extended west to Van Ness in 1877. Sold to Ferries & Cliff House Railway; route incorporated into Clay-Sacramento line.
Sutter Street Railway	2	5 ft (1,524 mm)	side	Jan 1877	Mar 1902	Initial route along Sutter from Market to Larkin, later extended to Central (Presidio); second (crosstown) line added in 1878 along Larkin from Bush to Hayes. Crosstown line eventually extended south along 9th to Brannan and north to Pacific, then west to Fillmore. Consolidated into United Railroads of San Francisco.
California Street Cable Railroad	3	3 ft 6 in (1,067 mm)	bottom, side (California Street)	Apr 1878	Jul 1951	Initial route along California from Kearny to Fillmore; eventually extended west to Presidio and east to Market. Second line added in 1891 (O'Farrell, Jones & Hyde) with small feeder line from Market, Jones & McAllister. Purchased by San Francisco in 1951.
Geary Street, Park & Ocean Railway	1	5 ft (1,524 mm)	bottom	Feb 16, 1880	May 5, 1912	Initial line ran along Geary from Market to Presidio, where a steam engine was added for service to western terminus at 5th and Fulton. Converted to standard gauge and side grip in 1892 and cable drawn line extended to 1st; franchise expired in 1912 and the line was taken over for Muni.
Presidio & Ferries Railway	1	5 ft (1,524 mm)	bottom	Jan 1882	Apr 1906	Ran along Columbus from Montgomery to Union, then west along Steiner; continued to Presidio via steam drawn line. Converted to electric following April 1906 earthquake; sold to San Francisco in Dec 1913 and became part of Muni.
Market Street Cable Railway	5	4 ft 8 1/2 in (1,435 mm)	side	Aug 1883	Oct 1893	Main line originated from Ferry Building and ran along Market. Branch lines opened along Valencia south to 29th (1883); and three branches west to Golden Gate Park along McAllister, Haight, and Hayes (1886). Market line extended to Castro, then south to 26th in 1887. Reorganized in 1893 as Market Street Railway and most lines converted to electric.
Ferries & Cliff House Railway	4	3 ft 6 in (1,067 mm)	bottom	Mar 1888	Oct 1893	Powell line ran from Powell and Market past Union Square to Bay & Taylor; second line ran along Washington and Jackson to Central & Sacramento, then continued using steam power to Cliff House. Reorganized in 1893 as Market Street Railway.
Omnibus Railroad & Cable Company	5	3 ft 6 in (1,067 mm)	bottom	Aug 1889	Oct 1893	Reorganized in 1893 as Market Street Railway.

=== Evolution of motive power ===
Originally, the cables were powered by stationary steam engines. For its initial three cables, the Ferries & Cliff House Railway constructed a three-story structure to house two 450 horsepower (340 kW) coal-burning steam engines. The building was complete with a 185-foot-tall (56 m) smokestack to vent away the heavy black smoke created by the Welsh anthracite coal that the company burned. Expansion of service required two additional 500 horsepower (370 kW) coal-fired steam engines in 1890. Coal consumption in 1893 was about 10 tons per day. The system was converted from coal to oil burning in 1901, and the lessened amount of smoke allowed the smokestack to be shortened to 60 feet (18 m). This shortened smokestack still stands at Washington-Mason car barn today.

Electric energy was introduced in 1912, when a 600 horsepower (450 kW) General Electric motor came online. By 1926, all steam operation of the cable ended when a second electric drive was installed, a 750 horsepower (560 kW) General Electric motor. With the reduction in the number of cable car lines, the single 750-horsepower electric motor was eventually able to take over the job of running all of the lines. The limitation with that configuration was that if one cable car on one line broke down, all lines had to be stopped. Consequently, during the 1984 reconstruction, each of the four cables (California, Hyde, Mason and Powell) was separately powered by its own 510 horsepower (380 kW) electric motor.

=== Decline ===
Powell St. cable car on its turn-table at Powell and Market Streets, 1945

The first electric streetcars in San Francisco began operation in 1892 under the auspices of the San Francisco and San Mateo Electric Railway.

By the beginning of 1906 many of San Francisco's remaining cable cars were under the control of the United Railroads of San Francisco (URR), although Cal Cable and the Geary Street Company remained independent. URR was pressing to convert many of its cable lines to overhead electric traction, but this was met with resistance from opponents who objected to what they saw as ugly overhead lines on the major thoroughfares of the city center.

Those objections disappeared after the 1906 San Francisco earthquake. The quake and resulting fire destroyed the power houses and car barns of both the Cal Cable and the URR's Powell Street lines, together with the 117 cable cars stored within them. The subsequent race to rebuild the city allowed the URR to replace most of its cable car lines with electric streetcar lines. By 1912, only eight cable car lines remained, all with steep grades impassable to electric streetcars. In the 1920s and 1930s, these remaining lines came under pressure from the much-improved motor buses of the era, which could now climb steeper hills than the electric streetcar. By 1944, five of those cable car lines had survived: the two Powell Street lines – by then under municipal ownership, as part of Muni – and the three lines owned by the still-independent Cal Cable.

=== Fight to remain open ===
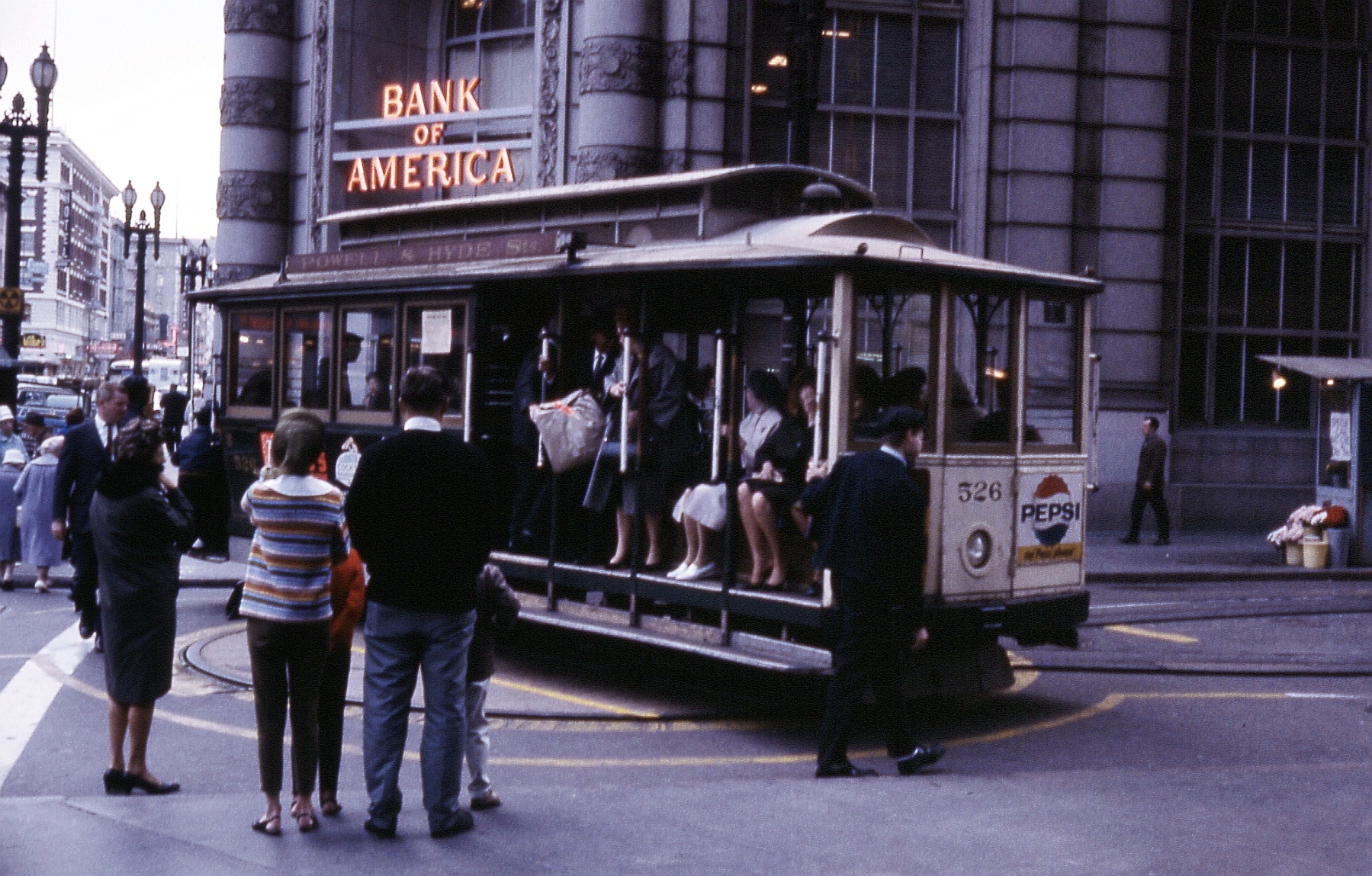
A cable car being turned around at the end of the line, August 1964

In 1947, Mayor Roger Lapham proposed the closure of the two municipally owned lines. In response, a joint meeting of 27 women's civic groups, led by Friedel Klussmann, formed the Citizens' Committee to Save the Cable Cars. In a famous battle of wills, the citizens' committee eventually forced a referendum on an amendment to the city charter, compelling the city to continue operating the Powell Street lines. This passed overwhelmingly, by 166,989 votes to 51,457. Klussman led another campaign in 1948 to have the city acquire Cal Cable, but the referendum fell short of the required 2/3 majority, with 58% in favor of acquisition; a second referendum in 1949, requiring a simple majority, passed and the city began negotiations with Cal Cable.

In August 1951, the three Cal Cable lines were shut down when the company was unable to afford insurance. The city purchased and reopened the lines in January 1952, but another referendum that would have funded maintenance for the California Street tracks and the powerhouse and car barn at Hyde and California failed in November 1953. The amendment to the city charter did not protect the newly acquired Cal Cable lines, and the city proceeded with plans to replace them with buses; in addition, businesses in Union Square and downtown began advancing plans to convert O'Farrell to automobile traffic, which would remove service through the Tenderloin district via the inner section of the O'Farrell Jones & Hyde line. The result was a compromise that formed the current system: the California Street line from Cal Cable, the Powell–Mason line already in municipal ownership, and a third hybrid line formed by grafting the Hyde Street section of Cal Cable's O'Farrell-Jones-Hyde line onto a truncated Powell–Washington–Jackson line, now known as the Powell–Hyde line.

This solution required some rebuilding to convert the Hyde Street trackage and terminus to operation by the single-ended cars of the Powell line, and also to allow the whole system to be operated from a single car barn and power house. Despite the changes, much of the systems infrastructure remained unchanged from the time of the earthquake.

=== Rebuild ===
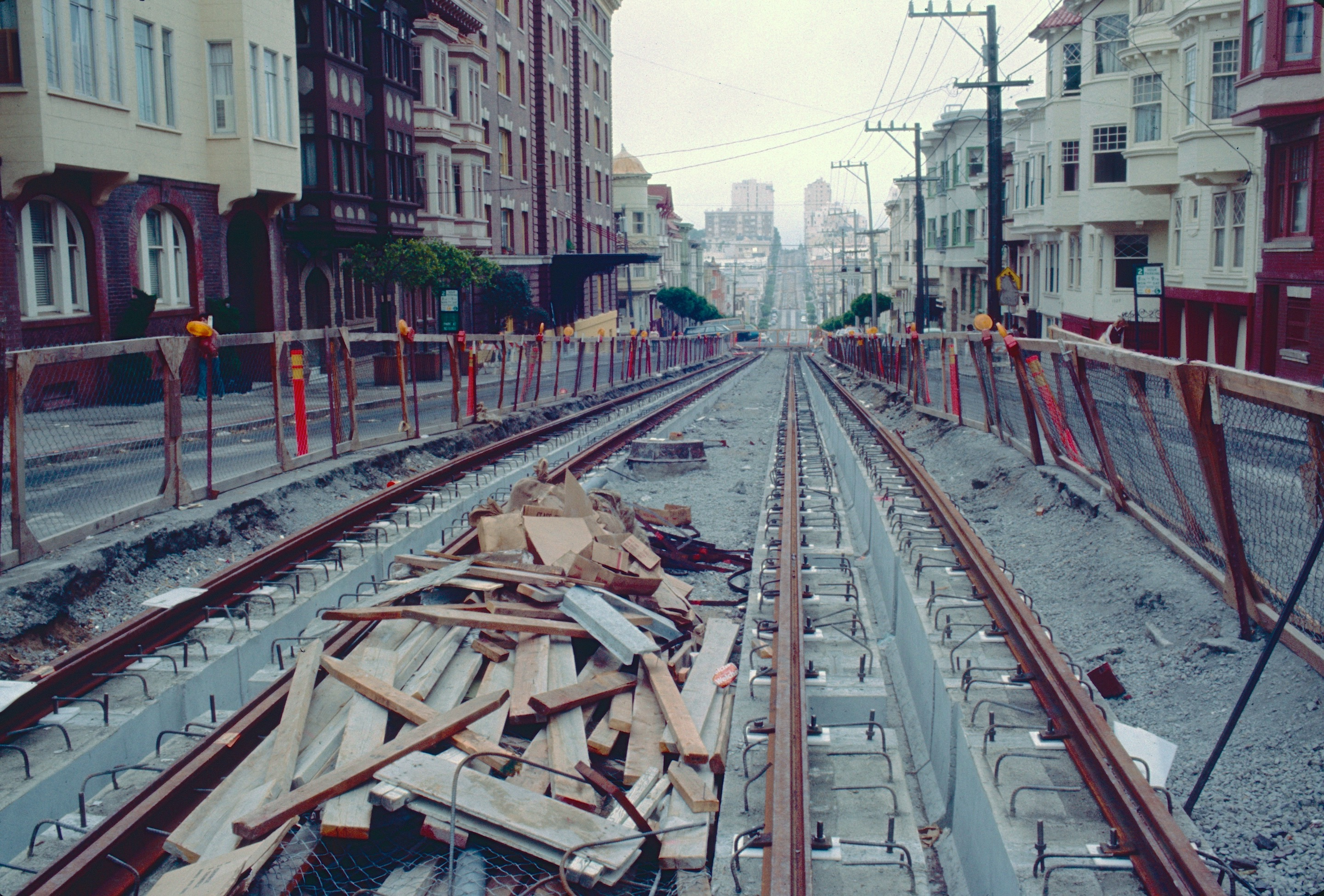
Hyde Street during reconstruction work in 1983

By 1979, the cable car system had become unsafe; it needed to be closed for seven months for urgently needed repairs. A subsequent engineering evaluation concluded that it needed comprehensive rebuilding at a cost of US$60 million. Mayor Dianne Feinstein, who took charge of the effort, helped win federal funding for the bulk of the project. Atari, Inc. donated $1 million, and Jefferson Starship raised $50,000 with a benefit concert. Journey also performed a benefit concert on December 2, 1981, at the Cow Palace.

In 1982, the cable car system was closed for the rebuild which involved the replacement of 69 city blocks' worth of tracks and cable channels, a rebuilding of the car barn and powerhouse within the original outer brick walls, new propulsion equipment, and the repair or rebuild of 37 cable cars. The Historic Trolley Festival was launched the following June as an expected-to-be-temporary substitute tourist attraction during the long closure. The system reopened on June 21, 1984, in time to benefit from the publicity that accompanied San Francisco hosting the 1984 Democratic National Convention.

=== Recent history ===
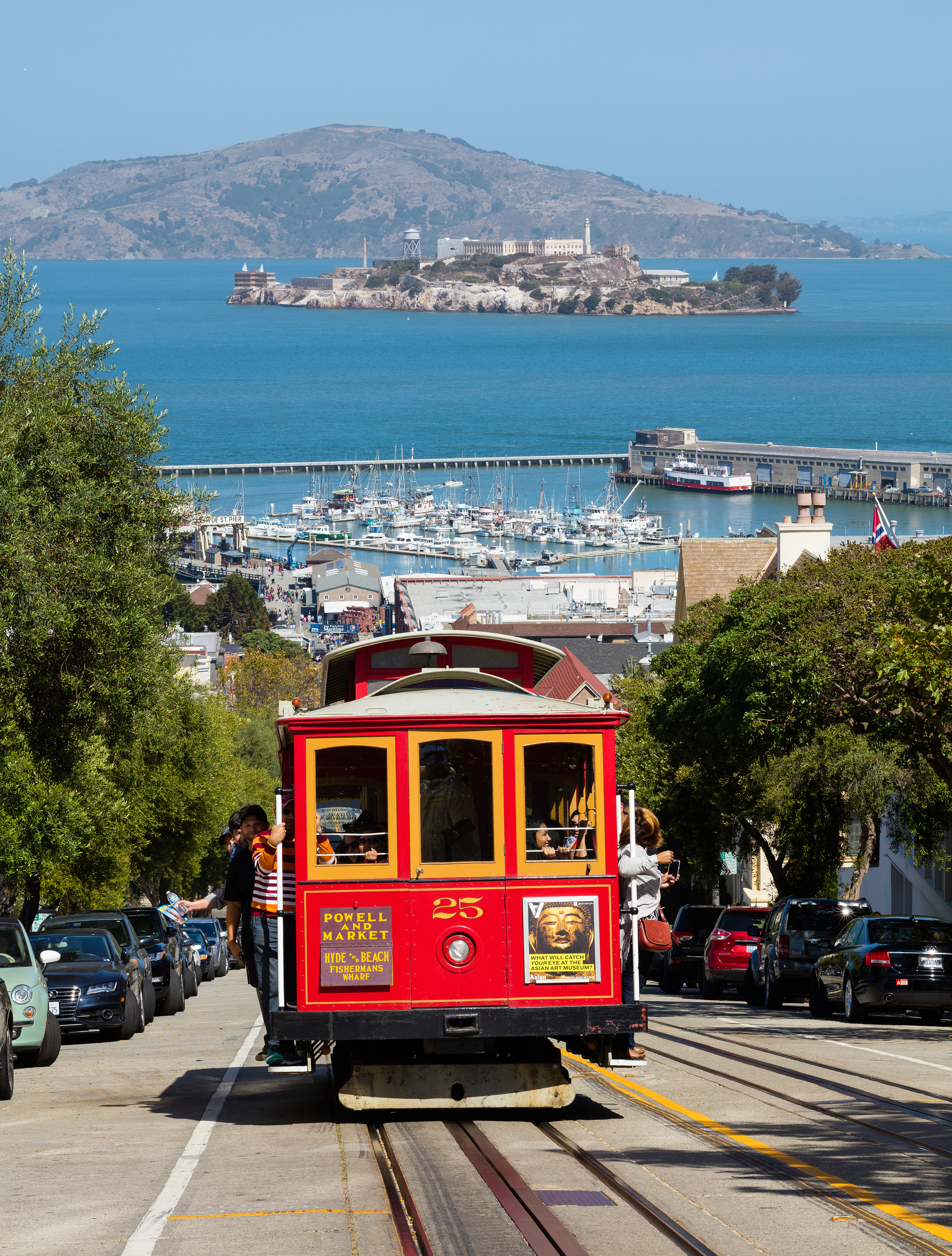
Cable car on Hyde Street in 2016, with Alcatraz Island and Fisherman's Wharf in the background

Since 1984, Muni has continued to upgrade the system. Work has included rebuilding historic cars, building brand new replacement cars, building a new terminal and turntable at the Hyde and Beach terminus, and a new turntable at the Powell and Market terminus.

Between 2017 and 2019, the system received a second, but less extensive rebuild. Over the two-year project, Muni rehabilitated the cable car system's gearboxes, which had been in service since the last rebuild in 1984.

The system was shut down in March 2020 to protect operators during the COVID-19 pandemic, as cable cars do not offer a compartment separating them from passengers. Limited service on all three lines resumed on August 2, 2021. Full revenue service began on September 4. On September 9, a valve failure caused the fire suppression system in the carbarn to activate, shutting down electric power to the powerhouse. Service resumed on September 18.

=== Controversies ===
The cable cars are an iconic part of San Francisco, but they are not without their critics. Most complaints center around the high cost of operating a system that mostly serves tourists, and the large number of accidents involving the cable cars.

The cable car lines serve around seven million passengers per year, but the vast majority are tourists, rather than commuters. The area where the cable cars operate is well-served by a large number of buses and trolleybuses that often give residents better options for their trips. Also, during busy times, the wait to board a cable car can often reach two hours or more.

While Muni does allow monthly passholders to ride the cable cars at no additional charge, single-ride fares are more than triple the fares charged on other Muni routes. The high fares led the San Francisco Chronicle to describe the cable cars in 2017 as a "cash cow" for Muni, yielding a yearly revenue of around $30 million. Still, according to Mission Local, the cable car system had a $46 million operating deficit in 2019. In 2006, then-Mayor Gavin Newsom reported that he had observed several conductors pocketing cash fares from riders without receipt. The following year, the San Francisco auditor's office reported that the city was not receiving the expected revenue from cable cars, with an estimated 40% of cable car riders riding for free. Muni's management disputed this figure and pointed out that safe operation, rather than revenue collection, is the primary duty of conductors. In 2017, after an audit showing that some conductors were "consistently turn[ing] in low amounts of cash", as well as a sting operation, one conductor was arrested on charges of felony embezzlement.

Among U.S. mass transportation systems, the cable cars have the most accidents per year and per vehicle mile, with 126 accidents and 151 injuries reported in the 10 years ending 2013. In the three years ending 2013, the city paid some $8 million to settle four dozen cable car accident claims.

== Network ==
The current cable car network consists of three routes:

- The Powell–Mason (Line 59 or PM) line, follows a common route with the Powell–Hyde line, running north and steeply uphill from a terminal at Powell and Market Streets, before crossing the California Street line at the crest of the hill. Once California Street has been crossed, cars coast downhill, off the cable, for three and a half blocks until the lines split as they turn left onto Jackson Street (as this is one-way, cable cars in the opposite direction use the parallel Washington Street). This line turns North, merges, and continues downhill along Mason Street, briefly half left along Columbus Avenue, and then down Taylor Street to a terminal at Taylor and Bay. This terminus is two blocks south of Fisherman's Wharf and is the closest to Pier 39. As with the Powell–Hyde line, there are manually powered turntables at each end to reverse the cars. The Powell–Mason line has been in operation since 1888.
- The Powell–Hyde (Line 60 or PH) line, follows a common route with the Powell–Mason line, running north and steeply uphill from a terminal at Powell and Market Streets, before crossing the California Street line at the crest of the hill. Once California Street has been crossed, cars coast downhill, off the cable, for three and a half blocks until the lines split as they turn left onto Jackson Street. As this section is one-way, cable cars in the opposite direction use the parallel Washington Street. The cars on this line continue uphill on Jackson/Washington to a crest at Hyde Street. Here the line turns North past the "crooked" Lombard Street, then runs steeply downhill (at 21%, the steepest grade in the cable car system) along Hyde Street, to the Hyde and Beach terminal (Victorian Park), which is adjacent to the waterfront at the San Francisco Maritime Museum and Ghirardelli Square. As with the Powell–Mason line, there are manually powered turntables at each end to reverse the cars. The line was spliced together in 1957 using portions of the O'Farrell, Jones & Hyde line and the Washington–Jackson line. Because this line offers iconic views of Alcatraz Island, passes Lombard Street and terminates near popular tourist destinations, it is the most popular with tourists and often has long waits to board.
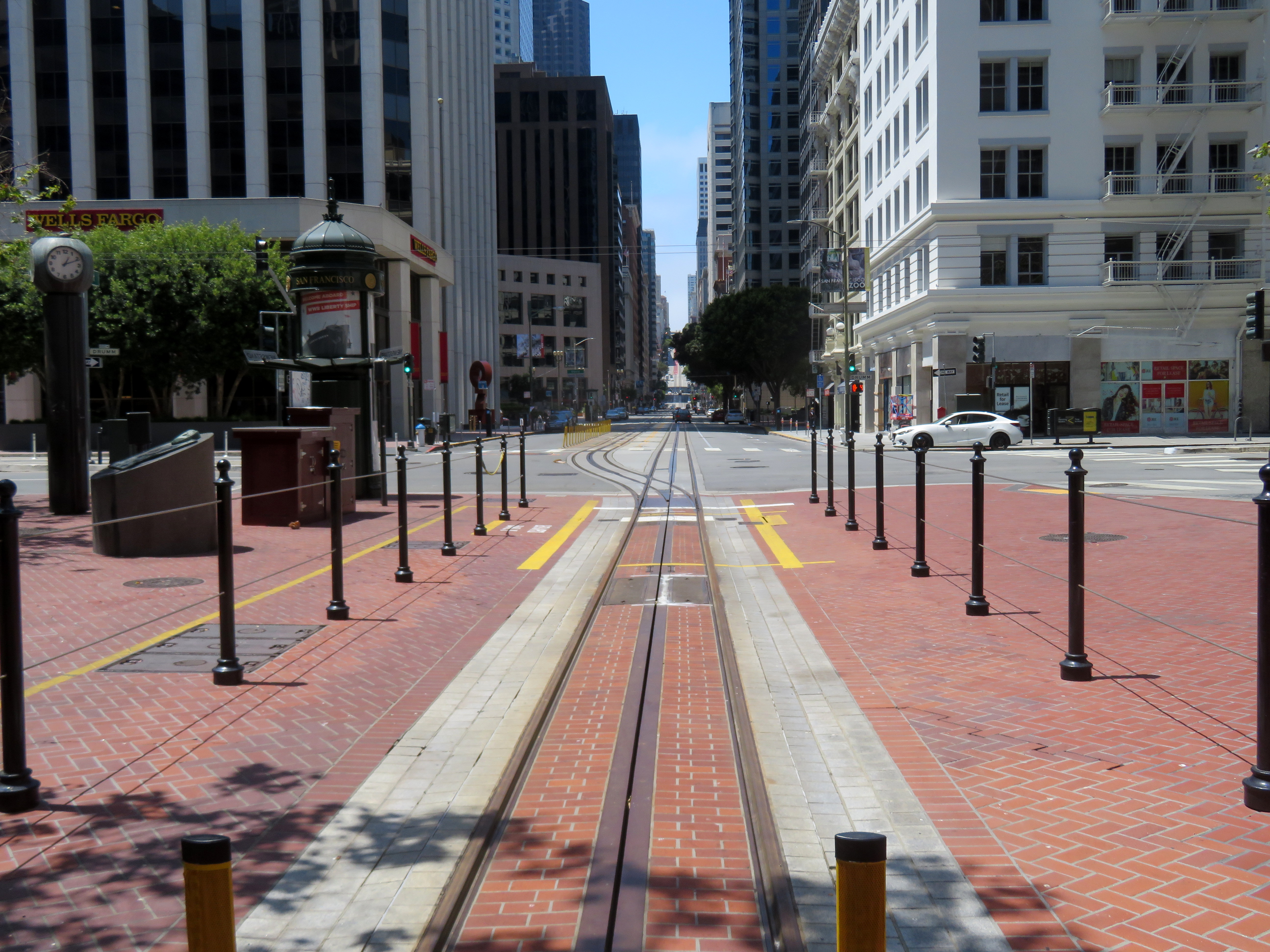
  The California Street line terminus, empty of cars, in 2020 during the COVID-19 shutdown
- The California Street (Line 61 or C) line runs east and west on California Street from a terminal at California and Market Streets, close to the famed Embarcadero to Van Ness Avenue. The California Street cable cars use double-ended cars with "grip" levers at either end of the longer cars which are operated in each direction without the cars being turned at the ends of the line, where the double tracks converge into a single "stub-end" track. The line once ran a much longer distance from Presidio Avenue to Market Street but service west of Van Ness Avenue was discontinued in 1954. Calls to restore the route to its original length are heard from time to time but nothing serious towards this end has been proposed. This route runs only on California Street, running at first uphill to the summit of Nob Hill, then more gently downhill to a terminus at Van Ness Avenue. This line is used to a greater extent by commuters, with the majority of passengers on weekdays being commuters.

There is also a set of non-revenue tracks from the California Street line along Hyde Street to join the Powell–Hyde line at Hyde and Washington. This connection exists to enable California Street cars to reach the car barn.

A small signal tower controls the crossing of the lines at the intersection of California Street and Powell Street. It has been rebuilt in 1907, 1937, 1967, and 2020–2021.

== Operation ==
=== Cars ===
The system operates a fleet of 40 cars, of which 27 are required for service during normal operations. The fleet consists of two types of vehicles:

- Single-ended cars serve the Powell–Hyde and Powell–Mason lines. These cars have an open-sided front section, with outward-facing seats flanking the gripman and a collection of levers that actuate the grip and various brakes. The rear half of the car is enclosed with seats facing inward and entrances at each end, and the car has a small platform at the rear. These cars are 27 feet 6 inches (8.4 m) long and 8 feet (2.4 m) wide and weigh 15,500 pounds (7,000 kg). They have a passenger capacity of 60, 29 of them seated. These cars must be rotated to reverse direction at each end of the line, an operation performed on turntables. Most of these cars were built or rebuilt at Muni's Woods Carpentry Division.
- Double-ended cars serve the California Street line. These cars are somewhat longer, having open-sided grip sections at both ends and an enclosed section in the middle. These cars are 30 feet 3 inches (9.2 m) long and 8 feet (2.4 m) wide and weigh 16,800 pounds (7,600 kg). They can hold 68 passengers, 34 of them seated. The California Street line lacks turning capabilities at each end, resulting in the necessity of the double-ended cars. Some of these cars are former O'Farrell, Jones, and Hyde Street cable cars, while some cars were built at Muni's Woods Carpentry Division.

There are 28 single-ended cars available for operation on the Powell lines and 12 double-ended cars on the California Street line.

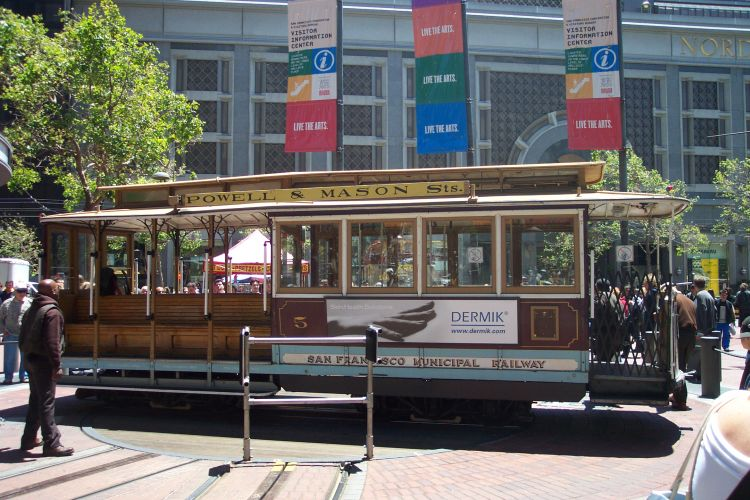
A cable car on the Powell & Market turntable. See a video of a cable car turnaround.

A Powell-Mason car at the Friedel Klussmann Memorial Turnaround

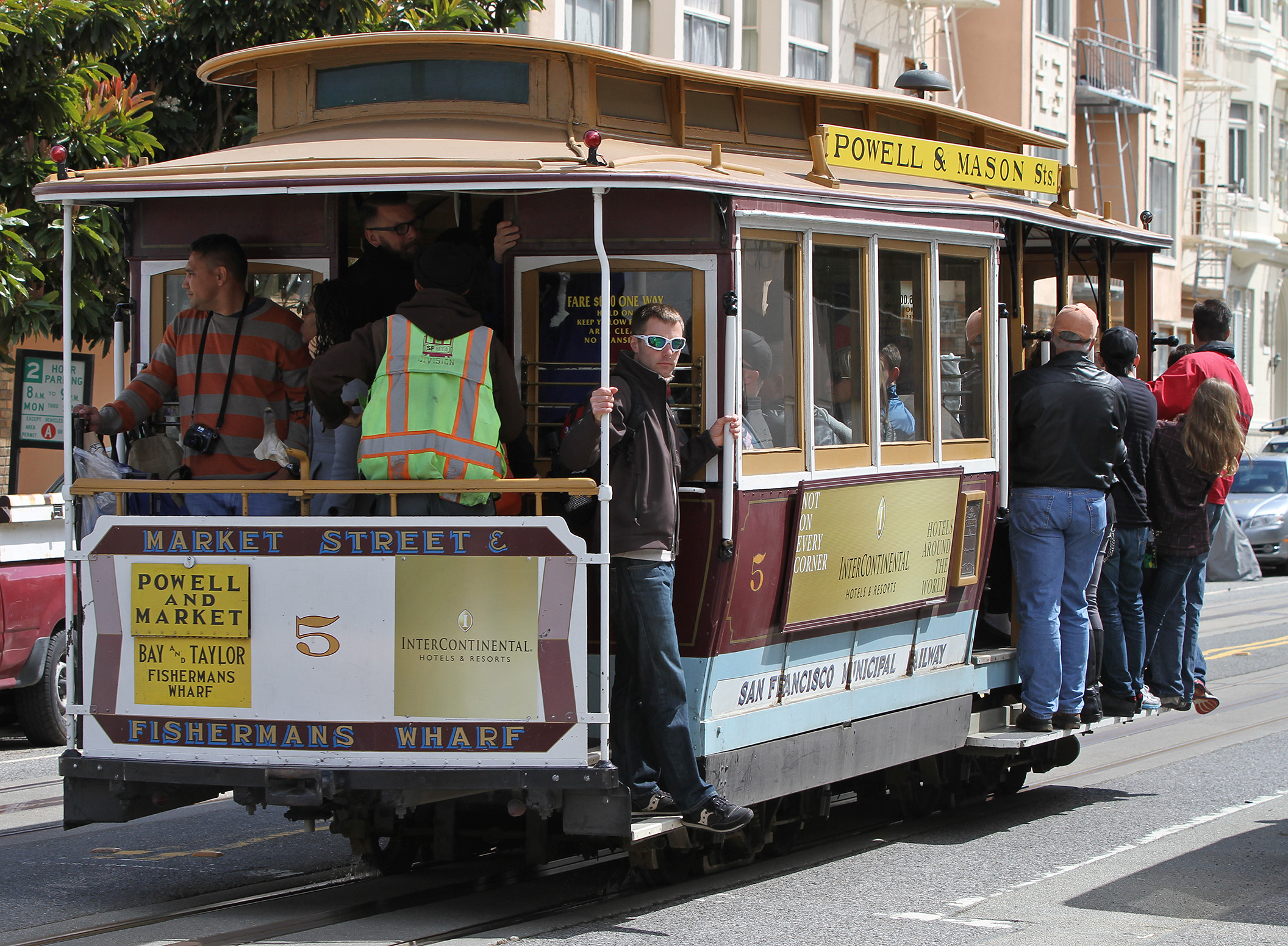
Rear view of a single-ended cable car on Mason St.

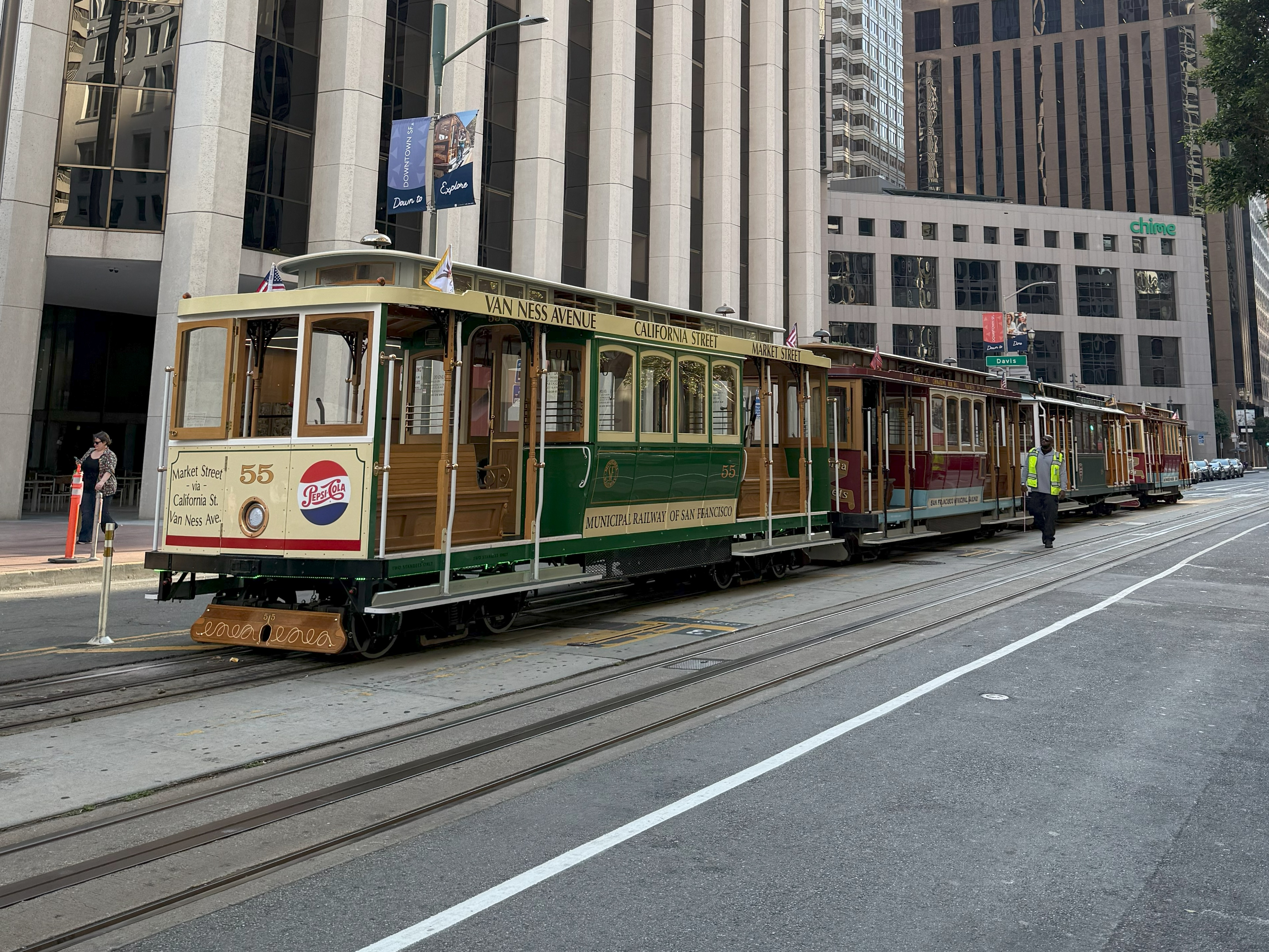
The California Street line cars stored close to the terminus at Drumm

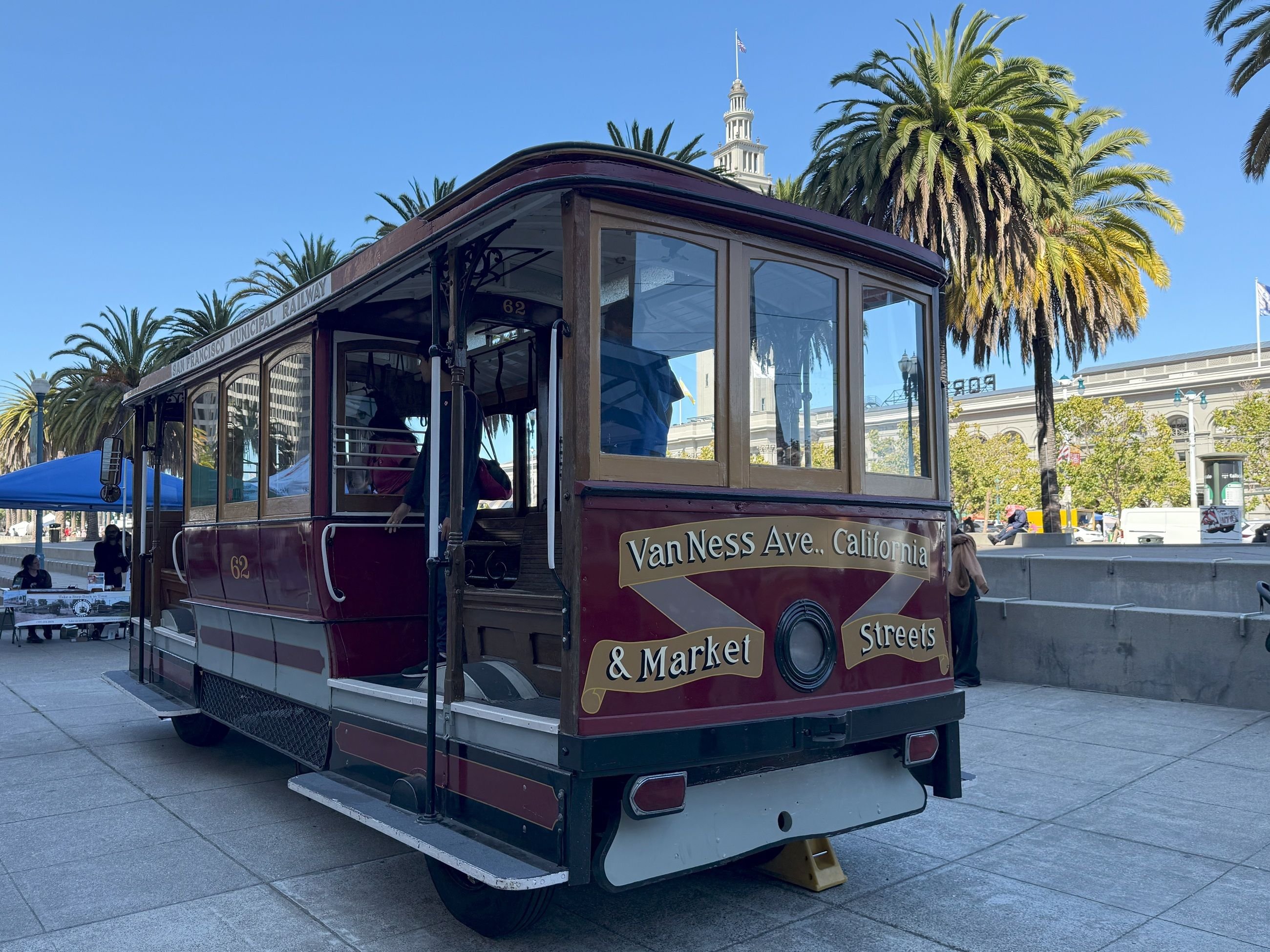
Motorized Car No.62 during Muni Heritage Weekend 2025

Both types of car ride on a pair of four-wheel trucks, to fit the track's 3 ft 6 in (1,067 mm) narrow gauge. The term California Street car, as in a car running on the California Street line, should not be confused with the term California Car. The latter term applies to all the cable cars currently operating in San Francisco and is a historical term distinguishing this style of car from an earlier style where the open grip section and the enclosed section were separate four-wheel cars (known as the grip car and trailer).

The cable cars are occasionally replaced with new or restored cars, with the old cars being moved to storage for later restoration. There are two historic cable cars in storage in the cable car museum: car numbers 19 and 42, which were used on the Sacramento-Clay and O'Farrell, Jones and Hyde Street lines, respectively. Car number 62, originally built for Jones Street Shuttle Line, was motorized and used for events.

In 1955 the Knott family won 4 cars at an SFMTA auction and relocated them to Knott's Berry Farm in Southern California. In 1956/7 they purchased two more cars for a total of 6. They were converted for electric operation in the parking lot. By 1979, park expansion plans caused the removal of the tracks and the attraction was shuttered for good. Originally 4 went back to SFMTA but were later resold. Some succumbed to the elements but several are still in existence -- two in Auburn, CA and one at the Southern California Railway Museum.

=== Cables and grip ===
The cable cars are pulled by a cable running below the street, held by a grip that extends from the car through a slit in the street surface, between the rails. Each cable is 1.25 inches (3.2 cm) in diameter, running at a constant speed of 9.5 miles per hour (15.3 km/h), and driven by a 510 horsepower (380 kW) electric motor located in the central power house (see below), via a set of self-adjusting sheaves. Each cable has six steel strands, with each strand containing 19 wires, wrapped around a sisal rope core (to allow easier gripping). The cable is coated with a synthetic lubricant to reduce wear and friction. Historically, pine tar was used to lubricate the cable. To start and stop the movement of the car, the grip operator (see below) closes and opens the grip around the cable (similar to the clutch of a conventional car). The grip's jaws exert a pressure of up to 30,000 pounds per square inch (210,000 kPa) on the cable. Due to wear and tear, a grip's dies have to be replaced after three days of usage.

There are four separate cables: one 16,000-foot (4,900 m) length and one 10,300-foot (3,100 m) length for the Hyde and Mason segments, a 9,300-foot (2,800 m) length for their common Powell section, and one 21,000-foot (6,400 m) length for the California Street line.

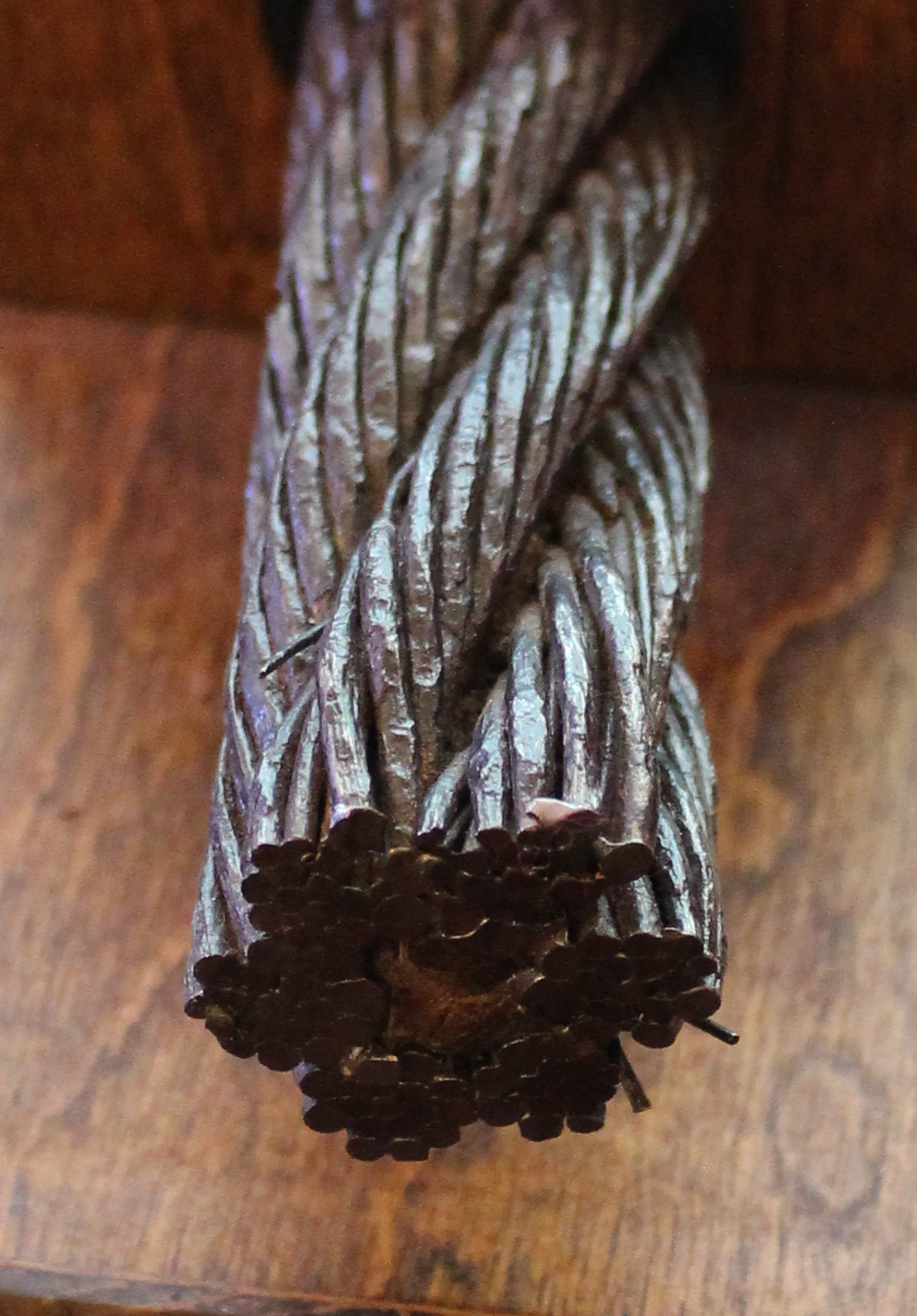
Section of a cable used around 1900 on the now-defunct Hayes line

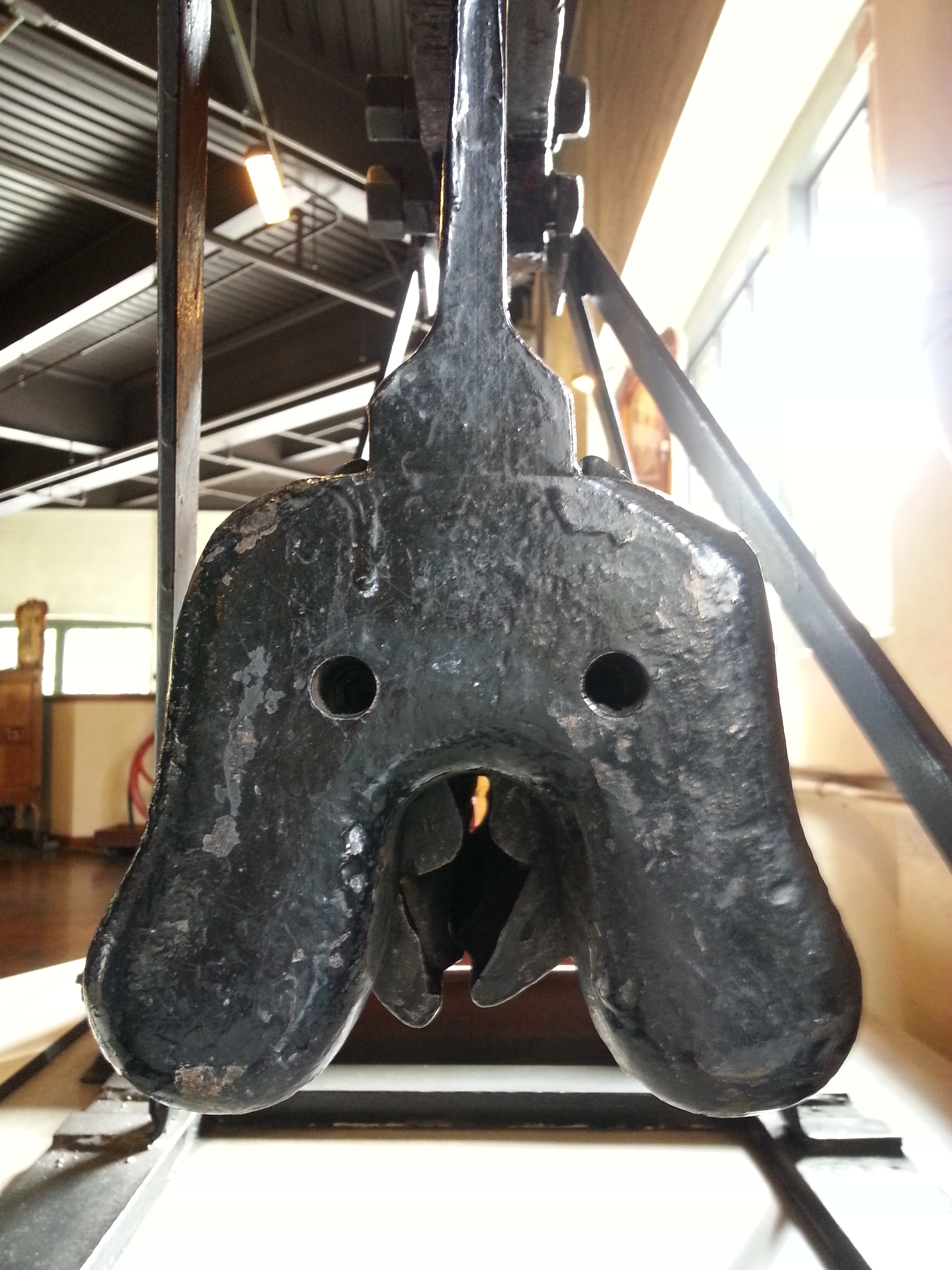
The grip that encloses the cable (here shown without cable, and closed jaws)

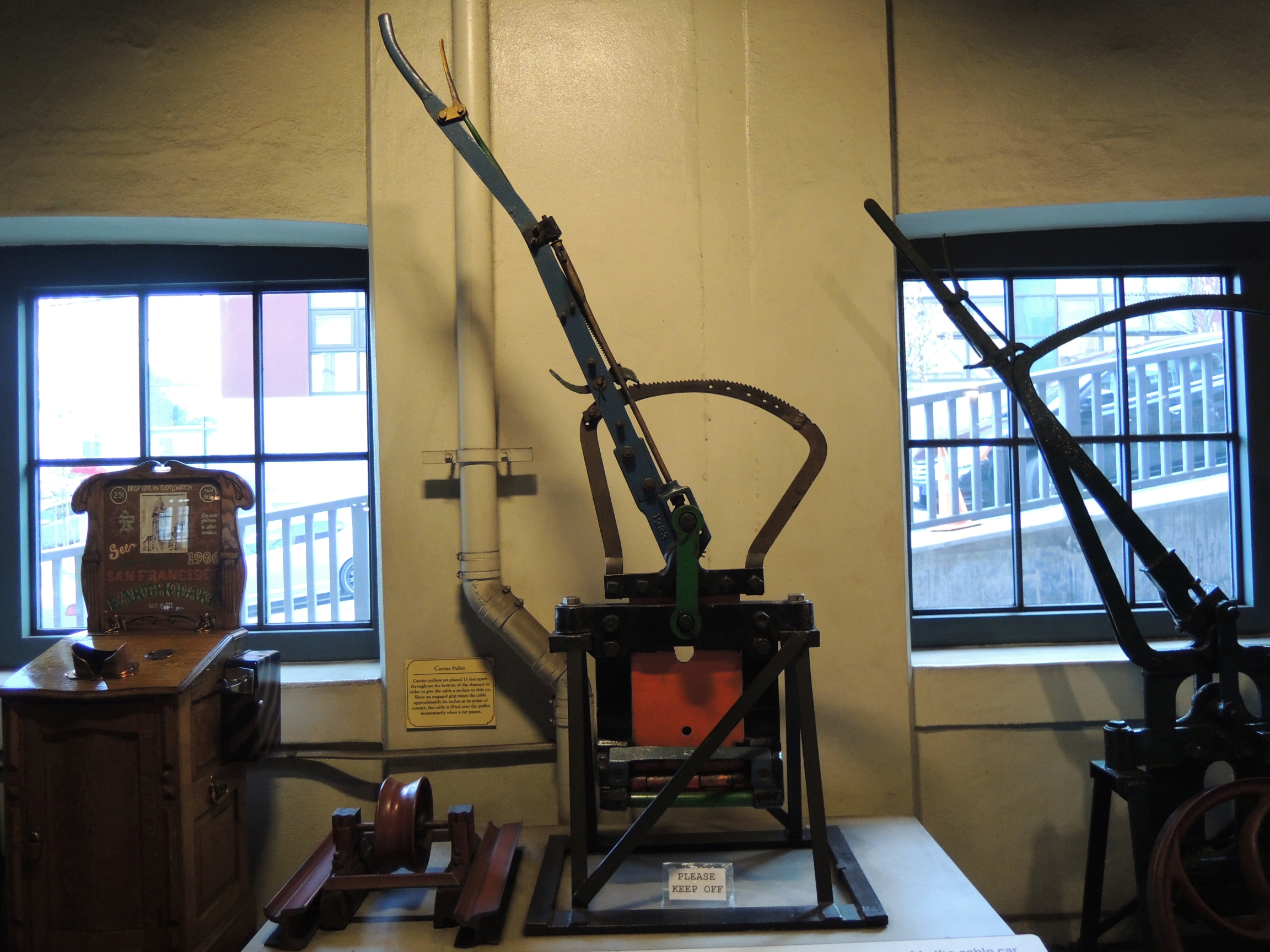
A grip mechanism removed from a car

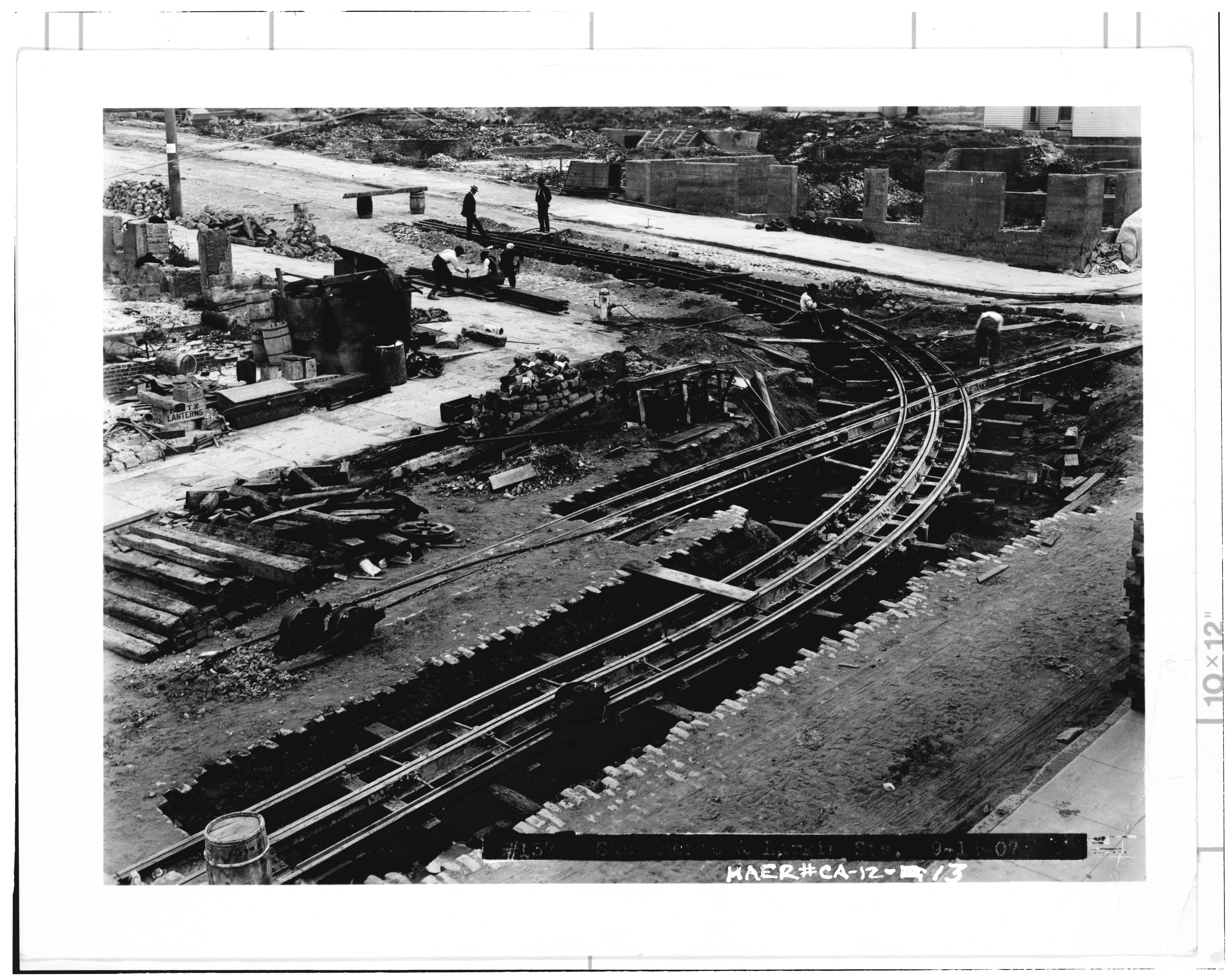
Tracks during reconstruction in 1907, showing the cable slot between the two running rails

=== Brakes ===
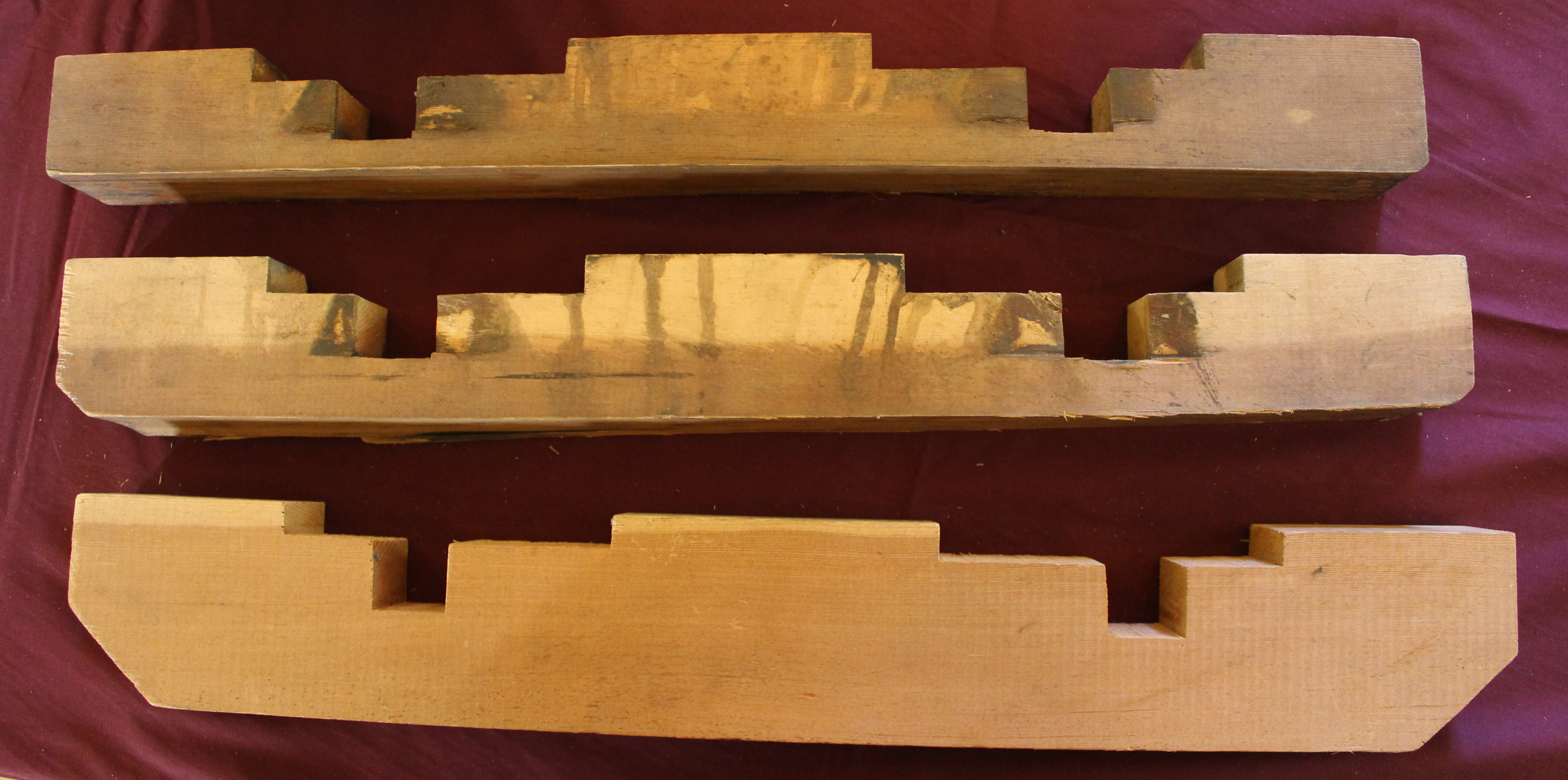
Cable car brake blocks in three different states of usage, from new (bottom) to near end of life (top)

Apart from the cable itself (which limits the speeds of cars when going downhill), the cable cars use three separate braking systems:

- Metal brake shoes on the wheels. The single-ended cars used on the Powell–Mason and Powell–Hyde lines have a foot pedal, controlled by the grip operator, that applies the brakes on the front wheels and a handle, operated by the conductor, that applies the brakes on the rear wheels. On the double-ended cars used on the California St. line, there are pedals near both grips, one controlled by the grip operator, the other by the conductor.
- Wooden brake blocks pressed against the track when the gripman pulls a lever. The four blocks are made of Monterey Fir and can produce a smell of burning wood when in operation. They have to be replaced after just a few days.
- An emergency brake consisting of a piece of steel, around 1.5 inches (40 mm) thick and 18 inches (460 mm) long, suspended beneath the car and pushed into the track slot when the gripman pulls a red lever. It wedges tightly into the slot and often has to be removed with a cutting torch.

=== Electrical system ===
Over the years, the cable cars have been retrofitted with several electrical components, including headlights, interior lighting, a GPS tracking system and cameras. However, unlike most modern trains, the cable cars have no method to generate power on board and instead must use large batteries that are recharged in the car barn. In 2018, the incandescent bulbs used for the headlights and interior lighting were replaced with LED bulbs which increased visibility for operators and had a lower drain on the batteries.

=== Crew ===
The car is driven by the grip, whose job requires strength, coordination, and balance. The grip must smoothly grip and release the cable, know the points at which the grip must be released to coast over intersecting lines or places where the cable does not follow the tracks, and maintain clearance from other traffic. The conductor collects fares, manages crowding, and controls the rear-wheel brakes on some hills.

On the second or third Thursday of each July, a cable car bell-ringing contest is held in Union Square between cable car crews, following a preliminary round held during the second to last or the last week of June. The preliminary round determines which contestants go on to the finals in Union Square, by a process of points awarded by a panel of judges.

=== Car barn, power house, and museum ===
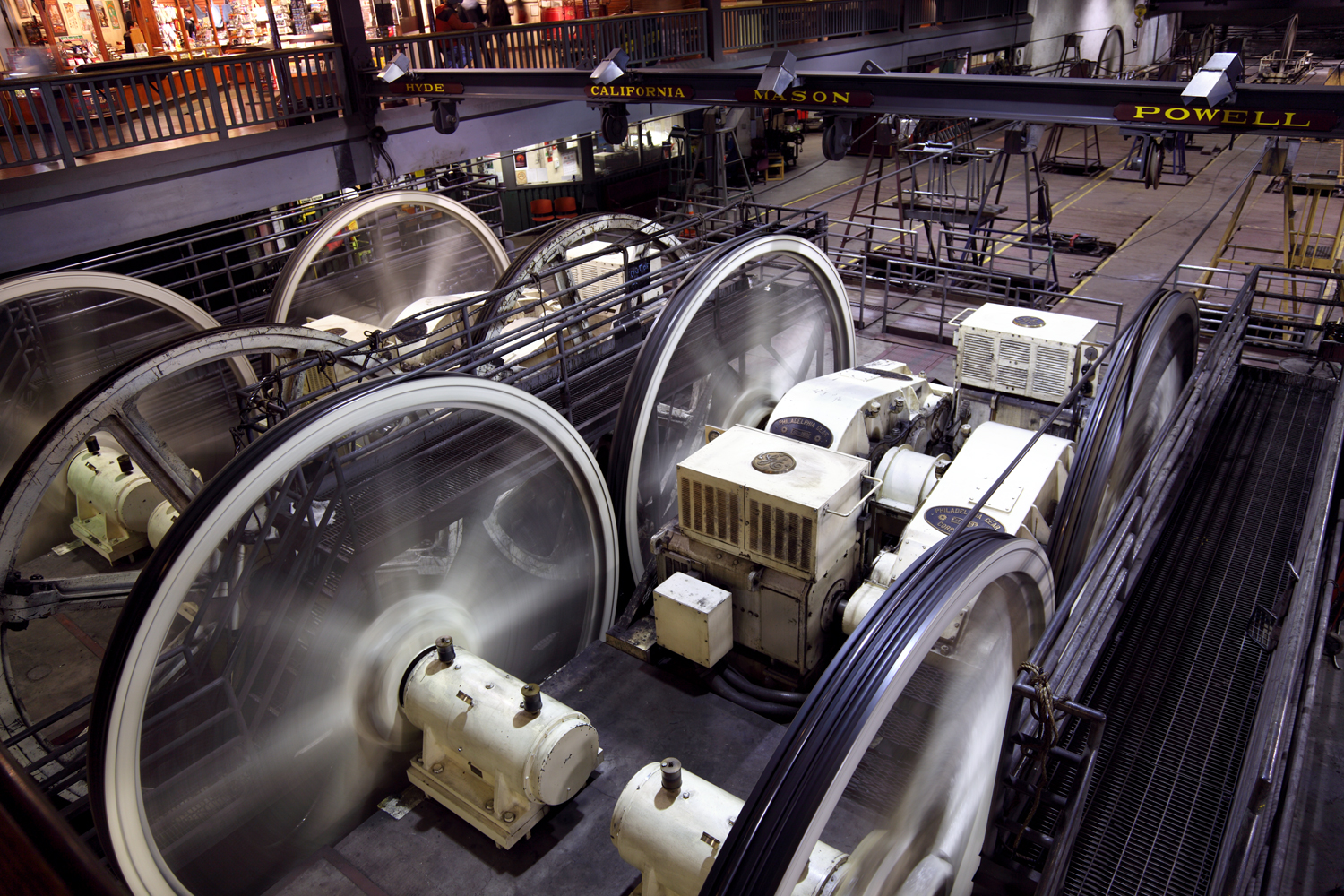
An interior view of the power house

The cable-car barn is located between Washington and Jackson Streets just uphill of where Mason Street crosses them. Cars reverse into the barn off Jackson Street and run out into Washington Street, coasting downhill for both moves. To ensure that single-ended cars leave facing in the correct direction, the car barn contains a fourth turntable. Cars are moved around the car barn with the assistance of a rubber-tired tractor.

As of 2018, the cable-car barn was staffed with 17 mechanics, six custodians, three carpenters, two painters, two supervisors and one superintendent.

The car barn is situated directly west of the power house and the Cable Car Museum. The museum's entrance is at Washington and Mason. It contains several examples of old cable cars, together with smaller exhibits and a shop. Two galleries allow the visitor to overlook the main power house, and also to descend below the junction of Washington and Mason Streets and see the large cavern where the cables are routed out to the street via huge sheaves.

=== Fares ===
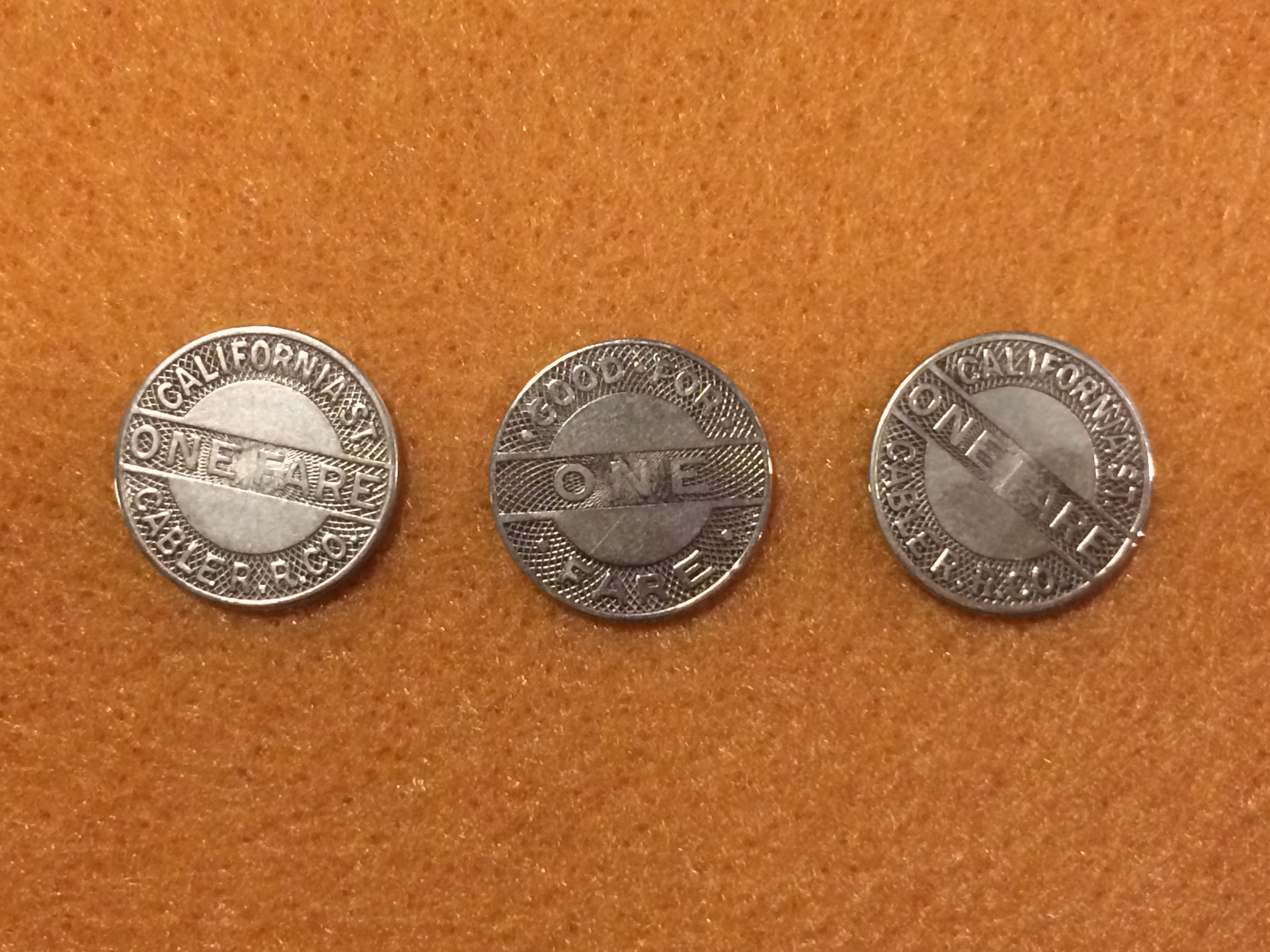
Historic cable car tokens displayed at the San Francisco Cable Car Museum

As of June 1, 2025, riding a cable car costs $9 for a single ride, except for seniors riding before 7 am or after 9 pm when the fare is $4. Cable car rides are included in monthly Muni passes, as well as 1-day, 3-day, 7-day passes, and the CityPASS program. Passes loaded on a Clipper card can be read by the conductor with a mobile device. Transfers or fare receipts are not accepted. In the 1960s, the fare for a single ride was 15 cents.

== See also ==
- 49-Mile Scenic Drive
- List of heritage railroads in the United States
- San Francisco Railway Museum
- St. Charles Streetcar Line, a streetcar line in New Orleans with National Historic Landmark status
- Great Orme Tramway, a similar cable-hauled street-running railway
