= William Eppelsheimer =

German engineer (1842–1920)

- Born: January 26, 1842; Alzey, Germany
- Died: June 9, 1920 (aged 78)
- Education: Polytechnikum Karlsruhe
- Occupation: Tramway engineer
- Years active: 1868–1885

William Eppelsheimer (January 26, 1842 – June 9, 1920) was a tramway engineer known for his work on cable car systems. He was born in Alzey in Germany and studied engineering at the Polytechnikum Karlsruhe. In 1868 he left Germany by ship from Bremerhaven for the United States. Arriving in New York he changed his German first name Wilhelm to William.

Eppelsheimer designed the Clay Street Hill Railroad in San Francisco. This was the first practical cable car line in the world and the first line in what was to become the San Francisco cable car system, although that line is more often attributed to its promoter, Andrew Smith Hallidie. He later designed the Eppelsheimer bottom grip for the Geary Street, Park & Ocean Railway, another San Francisco line, and this is still used by that city's surviving cable cars.

Eppelsheimer went on to design the Chicago City Railway, at one time the world's largest and most profitable cable car system, and London's Highgate Hill Cable Tramway, Europe's first cable tramway.

After working in Edinburgh on the Edinburgh Northern Cable Tramways he returned to Germany by 1885.
