= Clay Street Hill Railroad =

Cable car operator in San Francisco (1873–1942)

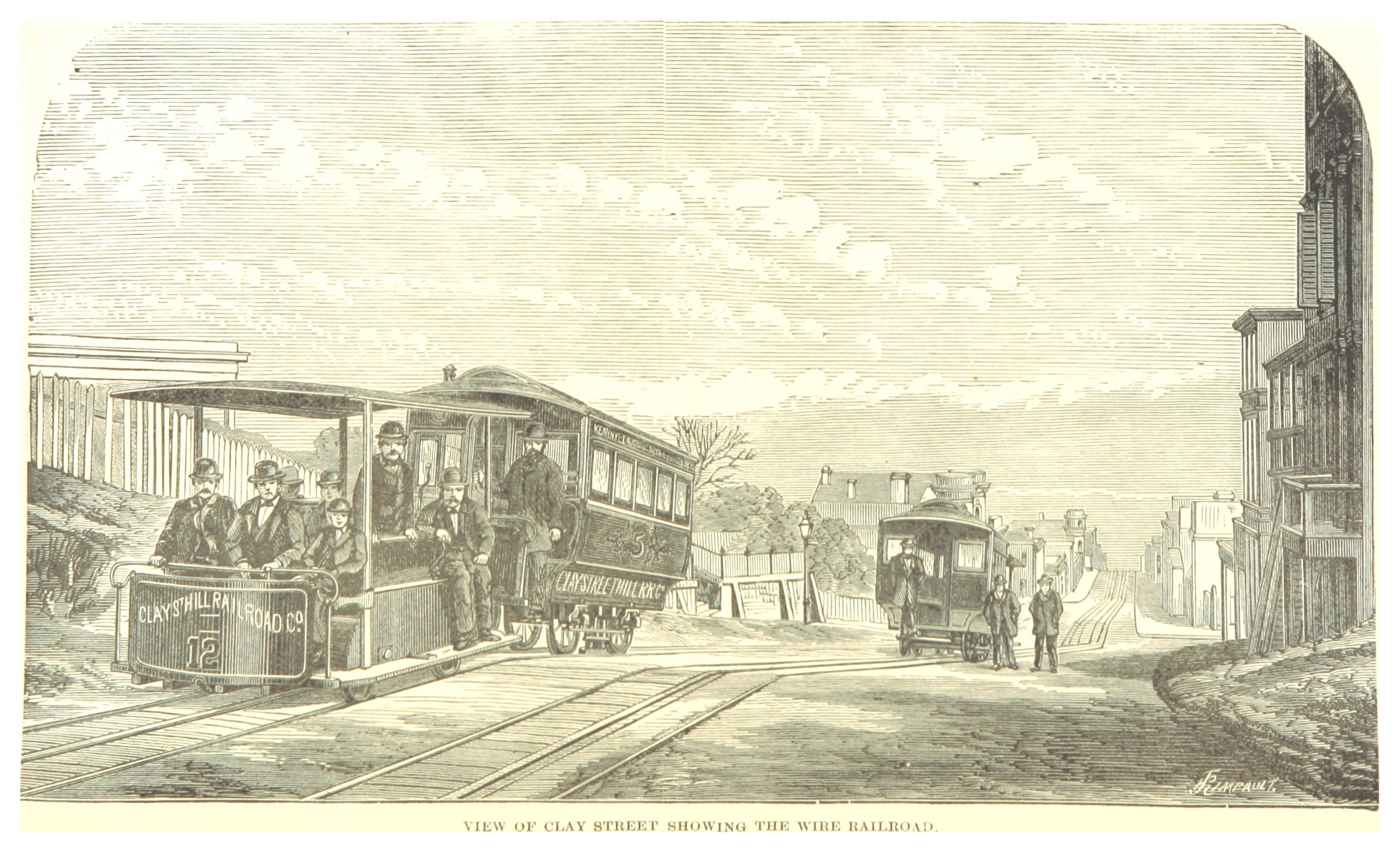
- Location: Clay Street, San Francisco

History
- Built: August 1, 1873
- Demolished: February 15, 1942

Site notes
- Owner: Clay Street Hill Railroad Company

California Historical Landmark
- Official name: Eastern terminus of the Clay Street Hill Railroad
- Designated: 1952
- Reference no.: 500

The Clay Street Hill Railroad was the first successful cable hauled street railway, operating in San Francisco, California. It began service on September 1, 1873, along Clay Street, climbing the slopes of Nob Hill using an underground moving cable rather than horses. Developed under the leadership of Andrew Smith Hallidie and engineered by William Eppelsheimer, the railway introduced the grip-and-cable system that became the model for cable railways around the world.

While none of the original railway remains in operation, the Clay Street Hill Railroad is widely regarded as the prototype for modern cable street railways. Grip car No. 8 has been preserved at the San Francisco Cable Car Museum.

== History ==
The line was initially advertised to potential bond buyers as a normal horsecar line, though one which would contend with a formidable 348-foot (106 m) rise in six city blocks. The main promoter of the line was Andrew Smith Hallidie, and the engineer was William Eppelsheimer. Accounts differ as to exactly how involved Hallidie was in the inception of the Clay Street Hill Railway. One version has him taking over the promotion of the line when the original promoter, Benjamin Brooks, failed to raise the necessary capital. In another version, Hallidie was the instigator, inspired by a desire to reduce the suffering incurred by the horses that hauled streetcars up Jackson Street, from Kearny to Stockton Street.

There is also doubt as to when exactly the first run of the cable car occurred. The franchise required a first run no later than August 1, 1873. However, at least one source reports that the run took place a day late, on August 2, but the city chose not to void the franchise. Some accounts say that the first gripman hired by Hallidie looked down the steep hill from Jones and refused to operate the car, so Hallidie took the grip himself and ran the car down the hill and up again without any problems.

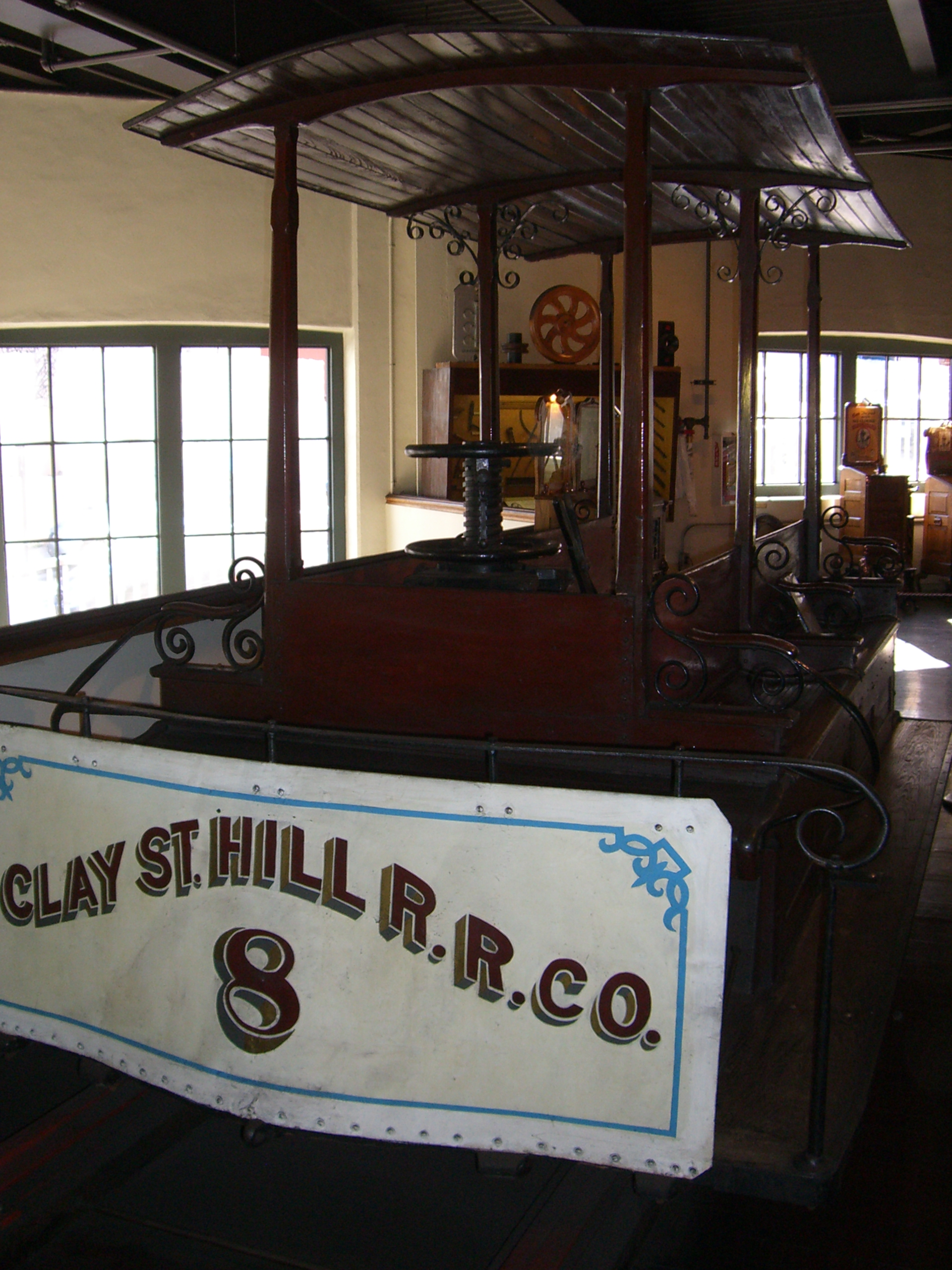
Clay St. Hill RR Co. No.8 at the San Francisco Cable Car Museum (2007)

The Clay Street line started regular service on September 1, 1873, and was a financial success. King Kalākaua visited San Francisco and inspected the new railway several months after its opening. It was carrying 3,000 daily passengers within a year of operation. The Leavenworth St. branch, a horsecar line, opened by November 1875, though was abandoned in 1882.

In 1888, it was absorbed into the Sacramento-Clay line of the Ferries and Cliff House Railway. The line also has the distinction of having the first section of cable route to be abandoned in San Francisco; tracks between Larkin and Van Ness were removed in 1891. It subsequently became a small part of the San Francisco cable car system.

== Design ==
The line involved the use of grip cars, which carried the grip that engaged with the cable. The grip car only carried the grip mechanism and the operator. Trailer cars with passenger accommodations were towed behind the grip car. The design was the first to use such grips.

== Legacy ==
Today none of the original line survives. However grip car 8 from the line has been preserved, and is now displayed in the San Francisco Cable Car Museum.

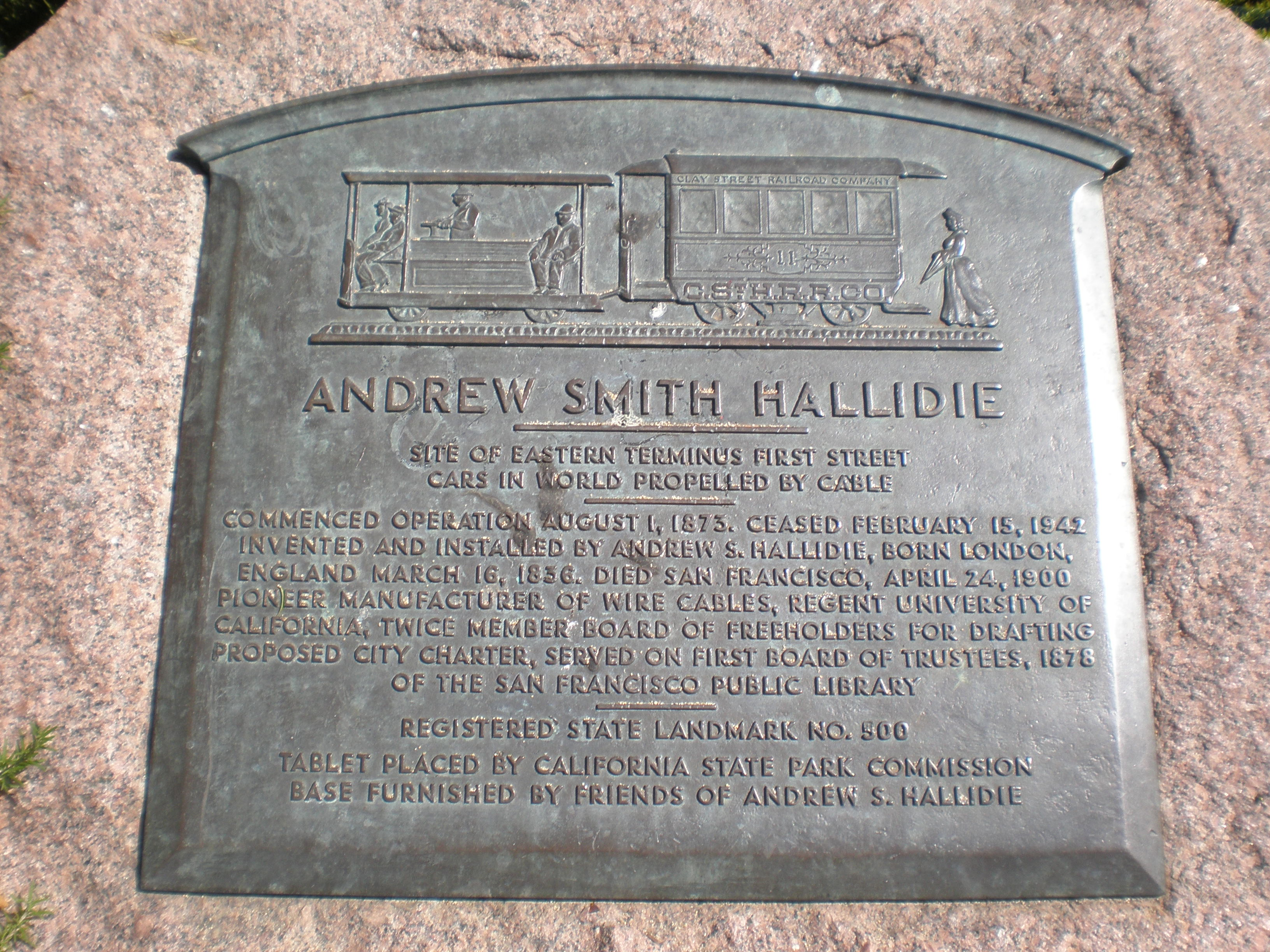
CHL #500: eastern terminus of first cable car system

The railroad was designated as California Historical Landmark #500, with the landmark marker being placed in Portsmouth Square at the site of its eastern terminus near the corner of Clay Street and Kearny.

=== In fiction ===
- In the film Herbie Rides Again, Mrs. Steimetz owns a cable car from the Clay Street Hill Railroad, which she calls "Old 22".
