= List of shopping malls in Bangladesh =

This is a list of shopping malls in Bangladesh, sortable by name, location, year opened and size (gross floor area). A shopping mall or shopping center is a building or set of buildings that contain retail units and a multiplex with interconnecting walkways enabling visitors to easily walk from unit to unit, of fering diverse brands and utilities at the same place. Bangladesh has some of the largest shopping malls in South Asia.

== Largest malls ==
Name	Location	Year	Size (Gross Floor Area)	Source
Jamuna Future Park	Dhaka	2013	380,000 m^{2} (4,100,000 sq ft)	
Bashundhara City	Dhaka	2004	111,480 m^{2} (1,200,000 sq ft)	
Centrepoint	Dhaka	2024	89,000 m^{2} (960,000 sq ft)	

== Dhaka ==
- Jamuna Future Park
- Bashundhara City
- Centrepoint
- Shimanto Square
- New Market
- Rajlokkhi Complex
- Mouchak Market
- Gulistan Shopping Complex

== Chittagong ==
- Biponi Bitan

== Kushtia ==
- ZPSM
