= Star Kabab =

Kabab restaurant chain in Dhaka, Bangladesh

Restaurant information
- Established: 1965
- Owner(s): Mir Aktar Uddin, Halima Khatun, Monira Begum
- Previous owner: Mir Momtaz Uddin
- Food type: Kabab restaurant
- Location: Thatari Bazar, Dhaka, Bangladesh
- Other locations: Thatari Bazar, Wari, Kawran Bazar, Gulistan, Farmgate, Bango Bazar, Dhanmondi-2, Shatmoshjid Road, Dhanmondi, Banani, New Elephant road, Johnson Road.

Star Kabab is a kebab restaurant chain located in Dhaka, Bangladesh. It has 11 branches in Dhaka. In 2015 it won the best Bangladeshi restaurant award in The Daily Star Foodiez choice awards.

== Controversy ==
In 2016 the chain was fined 46 million taka by the VAT Intelligence Directorate for tax evasion.

== See also ==
- Madhur Canteen
- Haji Biriyani
