= Shimanto (disambiguation) =

Shimanto is the name of several places in Japan.

- Shimanto, Kōchi (city) (四万十市), a city in Kōchi Prefecture
- Shimanto, Kōchi (town) (四万十町), a town in Kōchi Prefecture
- Shimanto River, in Kōchi Prefecture

Shimanto may also mean:

- Shimanto (train), a train service in Japan
- 3182 Shimanto, an asteroid
- Shimanto Square, shopping mall in Dhaka, Bangladesh
