= Nazirabazar =

Nazirabazar নাজিরাবাজার
- Neighborhood
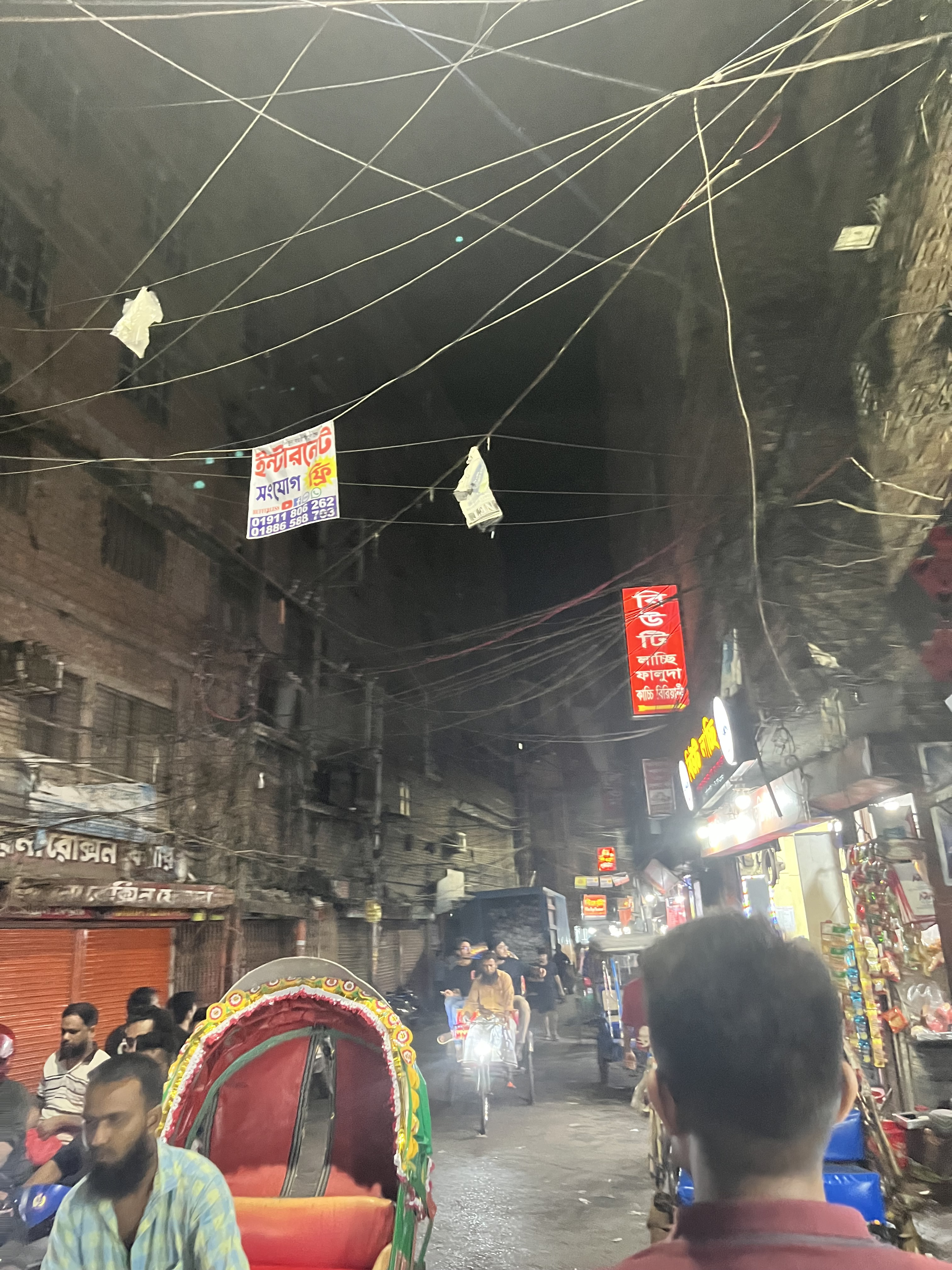
- Nazirabazar, Old Dhaka

- Location within Dhaka
- Coordinates: 23.7195063°N 90.4073558°E
- Country: Bangladesh
- District: Dhaka
- Region: Old Dhaka

Nazirabazar is a neighborhood of Dhaka. It is situated in old part of the city. There are many shoe factories. This place is famous for many restaurants and eateries also.

Nazirabazar area consisting of Kazi Alauddin Road, Bangshal, France Road area. To arrive at Nazirabazar, one can start walking from Bangabazar that situated near Gulistan.

== History ==
In Mughal period, various government department officials were called Nazir. They lived around this area and that's why the market is named Nazirabazar.

Sheikh Fazilatunnesa Mujib moved into a house in Nazirabazar when Sheikh Mujibur Rahman was arrested in 1954 after the Governor General of Pakistan, Ghulam Mohammad, abolished the United Front cabinet and issued a governorship.

Earl Robert Miller ate biryani of Nazirabazar. The former US ambassador praised its biryani.

== Restaurants ==
Eateries of Nazirabazar area, popular to foodies, are open every hour of the day. While walking along Kazi Alauddin Road, there are various food stalls on both sides of the road. Some distance away is the Nazirabazar crossroads. Surrounding this crossroads are all the traditional food shops of old Dhaka. There are biryani, chap, kebab, fried beef belly, sweets, bakarkhani and many more. There are shops of Hajir Biryani, Nanna Biryani, Mamun Biryani and Hanif Biryani in Nazira Bazaar. Beauty Lacchi and Faluda shop in Nazirabazar is popular all over the country. They sell lassi, falooda and Beauty Shorbet. Popular shop Bismillah Kabab Ghar is located right next to Nazirabazar crossroads. The specialty of this shop is their khasir gurda along with various kebabs. Bukhari Restaurant is another famous restaurant in Nazirabazar for Chap and Naan. Their signature dish is Chicken vegetable chap with three types of naan. Fire paan are being sold at paan shops on Agasadek Road and Kazi Alauddin Road in Nazirabazar. In the mattha shops in Nazirabazar, morning mattha-chhena, another famous item of Old Dhaka are sold.

== 2021 Fire ==
In December 2021, a fire broke out in a shoe factory in Nazirabazar area.
