= Madhur Canteen =

Restaurant at University of Dhaka

- মধুর রেস্তোরা
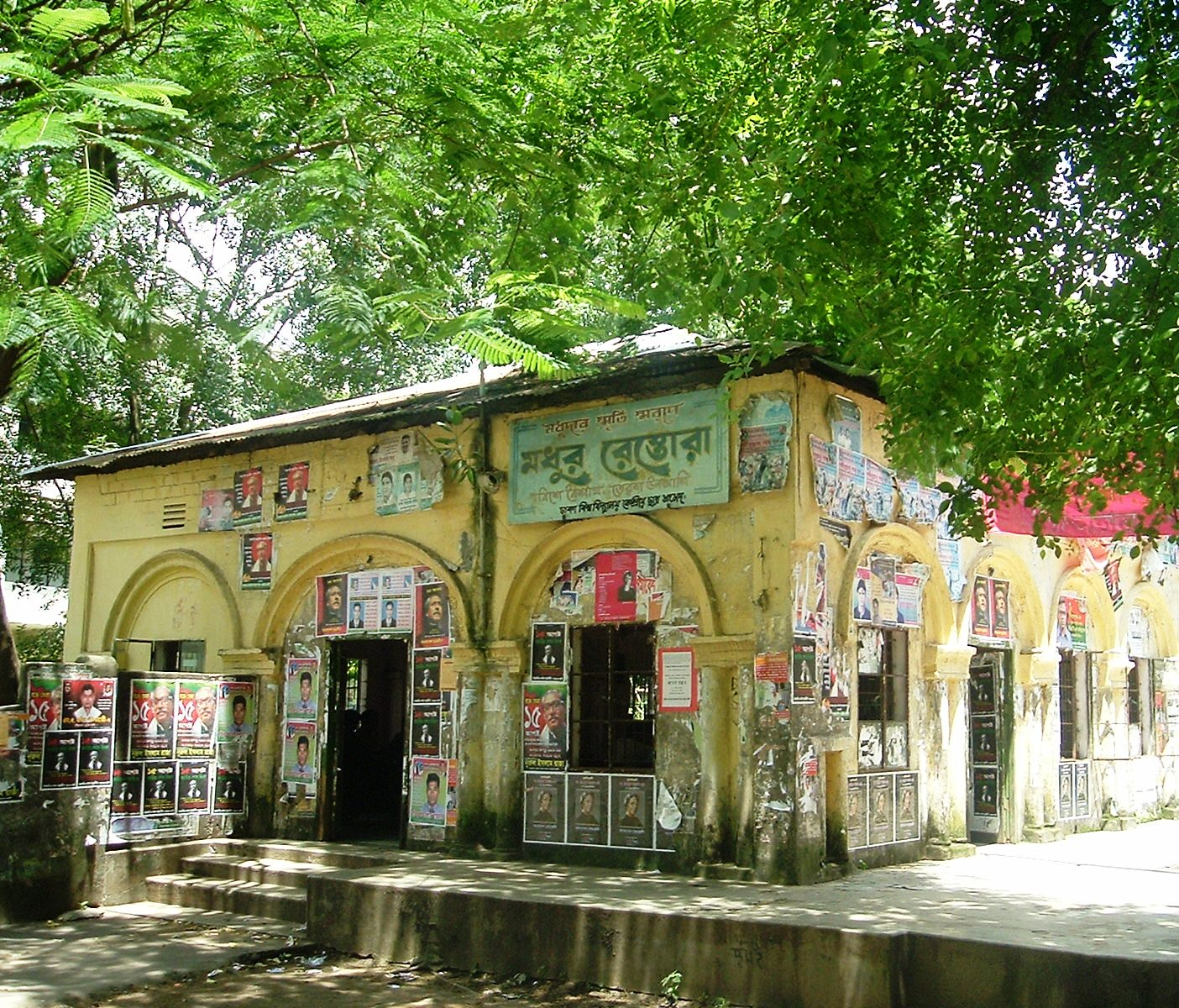
- Interactive map of the Madhur Canteen area

General information
- Location: Dhaka University, Dhaka, Bangladesh
- Coordinates: 23.731547°N 90.392497°E
- Groundbreaking: 1873
- Renovation cost: free
- Client: students
- Landlord: DU
- List of Old Dhaka Heritage Sites

Madhur Canteen (Bengali: মধুর রেস্তোরা, romanized: Modhur restora, lit. 'Madhu's canteen') is a familiar name in the history of the Dhaka University as well as in the national politics of Bangladesh because of its association with various political movements which originated from the Dhaka University. The canteen's current location holds important architectural and heritage value.

Madhusudan Dey (Modhu), the canteen's founder, is an equally important figure in the socio-political history of the region. He was killed on 25 March 1971 at the beginning of the Bangladesh Liberation War. As part of Operation Searchlight, the Pakistan Army attacked the Dhaka University. Madhusudan Dey was taken to Jagannath Hall by the Pakistani armed forces, where he was executed along with many university students. After the Liberation War, Arun Kumar Dey assumed the responsibility of running the canteen. Years after Modhu's death, the canteen remains a significant landmark and a place for gathering in the community.

== History of the canteen ==
=== Origin ===
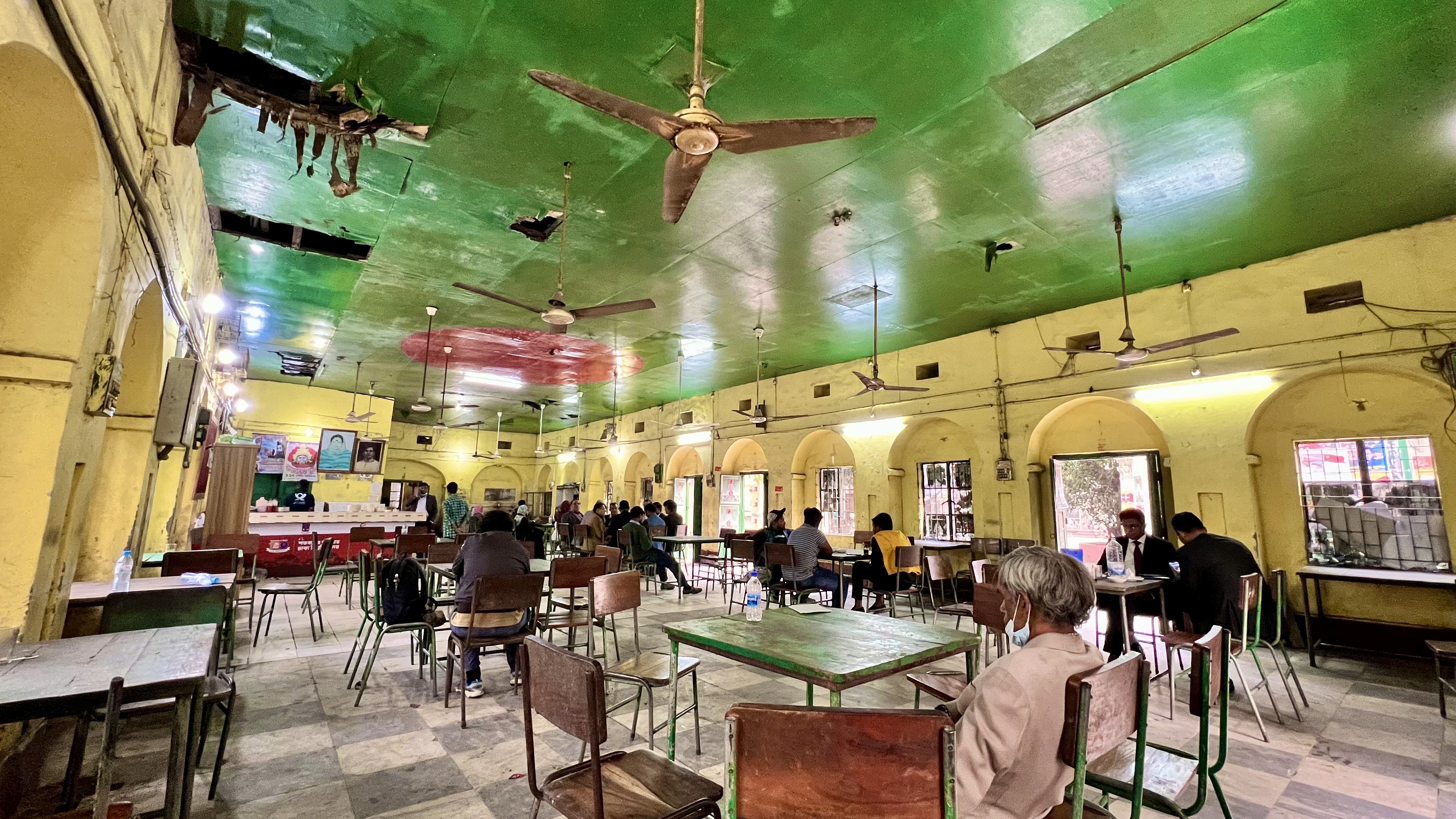
Madhur Canteen inside (December 2021)

Madhur Canteen was started in 1921, when Madhusudan Dey (Modhu) came to Dhaka with his father, Aditya Chandra, at the age of 15. Aditya Chandra, with the permission of the university authorities, began selling food in the Dhaka University Campus which was, at the time, located in the present Dhaka Medical College building. The canteen was shifted later when the Arts Faculty of the university was shifted to a new building at Nilkhet.

=== Political movements ===
Madhur canteen played a pivotal role in the Bangladesh Liberation Movement. It was the focal point for the start of various political movements in the country. The canteen played a significant part in the Language Movements of 1948 and 1952, the movement of fourth-class Dhaka University employees in 1949, the student's revolt against the black laws (kala kanoon) of the university, and the 1969 mass uprising in East Pakistan. During these critical political moments, Madhur Canteen was a social epicentre frequented by student leaders and activists. The Pakistani army targeted Madhur Canteen on 25 March 1971, with the beginning of operation Searchlight.

=== Massacre ===
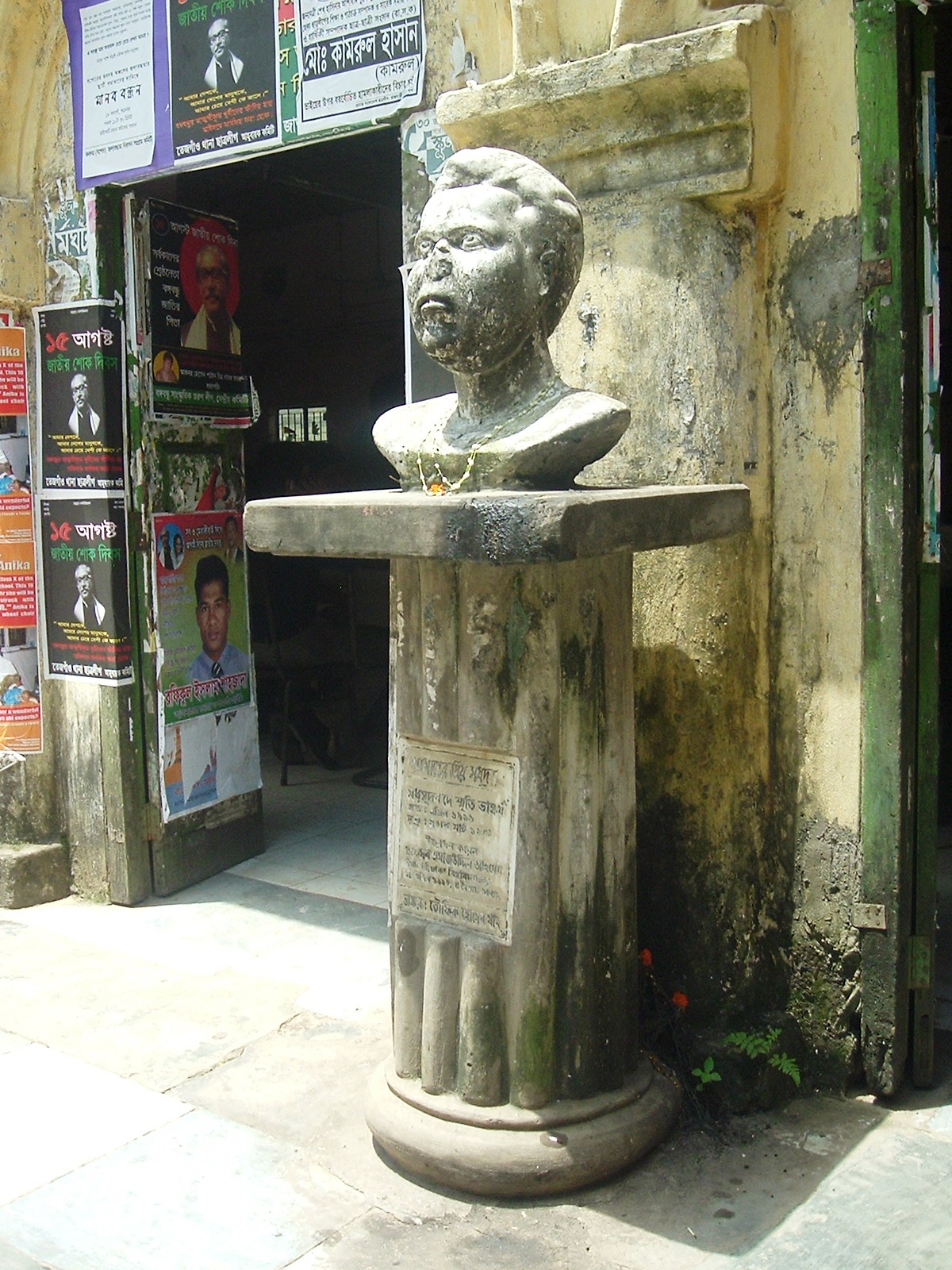
Memorial to Madhusudan Dey at the canteen

Madhusudan Dey was killed on 26 March 1971. The Pakistani military stormed his house and started firing in the early morning hours. Dey's wife, son and daughter-in-law were amongst those killed. Madhusudan Dey was injured in the firing, arrested and taken to the Jagannath Hall playground where he was killed alongside many students.

== Present location ==
Madhur Canteen was reconstructed after suffering severe damage during the liberation war. The canteen was relocated from its original location in the present-day Dhaka Medical college building to an old structure. The canteen's present location served as the Durbar Hall of the Dhaka Nawabs. Apart from being used as a venue for formal and informal meetings, it also served as a skating rink and ballroom for the enjoyment of the Nawabs. Construction of the building began in 1873 which continued over several years. In 1906, a conference was held in the building, sponsored by Nawab bahadur Sir Khwaja Salimullah, the Nawab of Dhaka, that led to the formation of the All-India Muslim League.

In 1995, a statue of Madhusudan Dey created by Toufiq Hosen Khan, a student of fine arts, was installed in front of the Madhur Canteen.

== Gallery ==
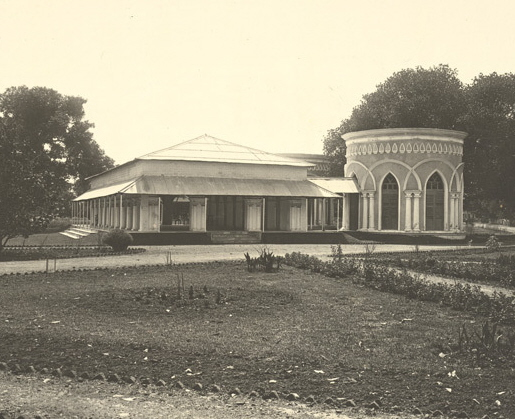
The Jalsaghar buildings in 1904

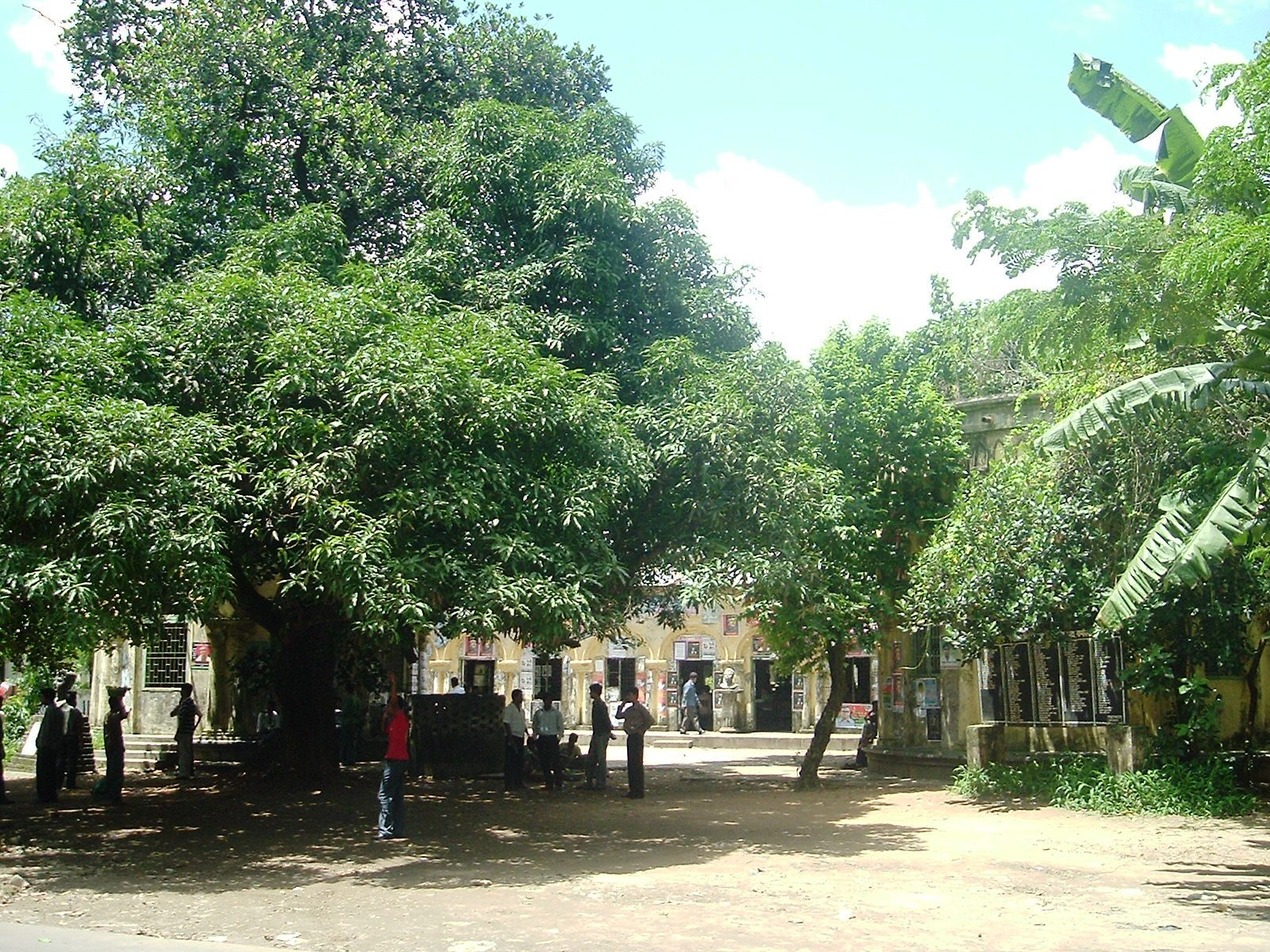
The compound of the canteen

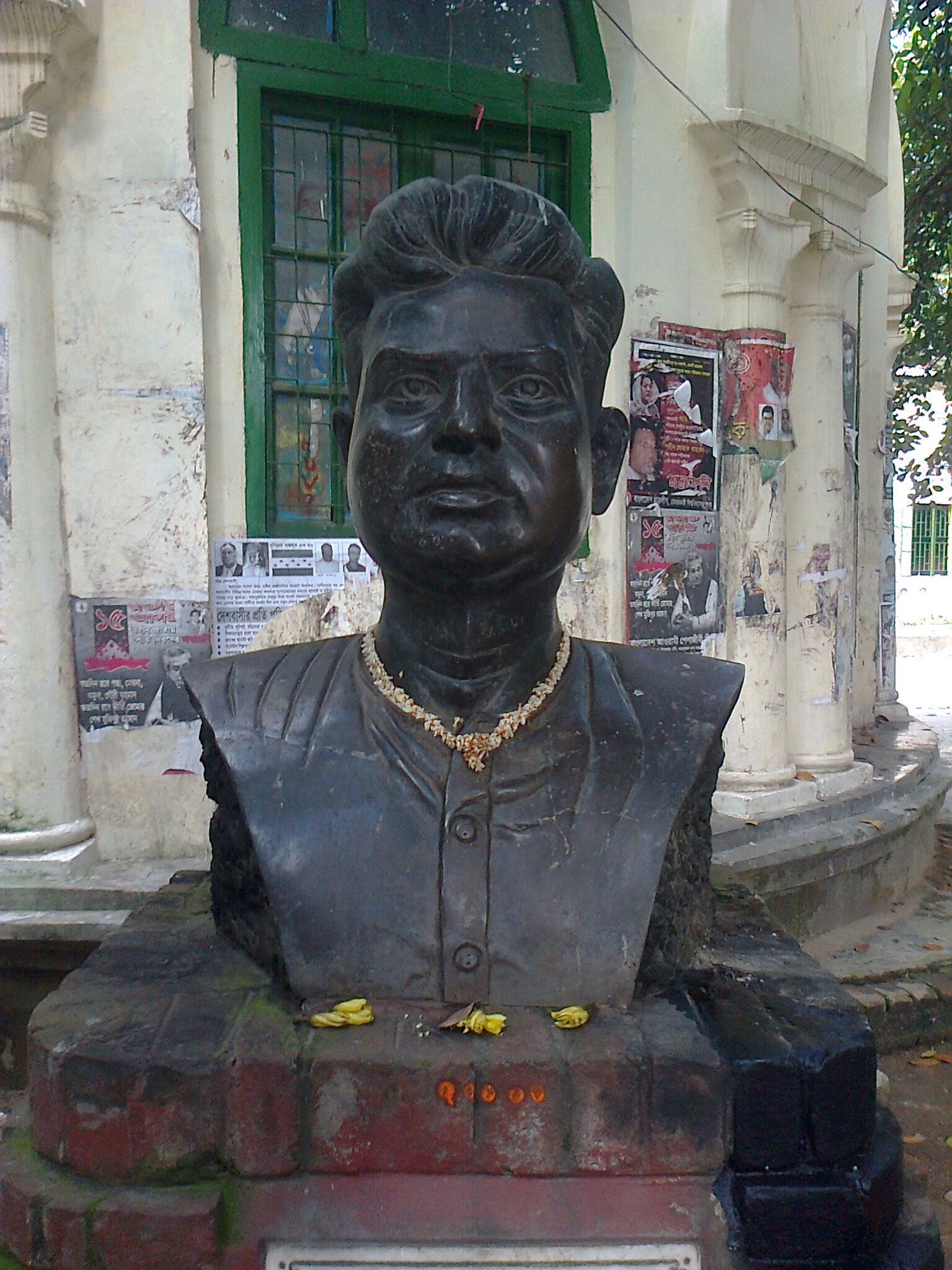
Madhur Canteen

== See also ==
- Haji Biriyani
- Star Kabab
