= Haji biryani =

- Interactive map of Haji biryani

Restaurant information
- Established: 1939; 87 years ago
- Owner: Haji Mohammad Shahed
- Previous owners: Haji Mohammad Hossain, Haji Mohammad Golam Hossain
- Food type: Chevon (goat's meat) biryani
- Location: 70 Kazi Alauddin Road, Nazira Bazar, Dhaka, Bangladesh
- Seating capacity: 50
- Other locations: Motijheel
- Website: hajibiriyani.com

Haji biryani (also known as Hajir biryani) is one of the oldest restaurants in the heart of Old Dhaka, Bangladesh, selling chevon biryani (dish made with highly seasoned rice and goat's meat). The restaurant also sells borhani (a salted mint drink made of yogurt) and soft drinks. In 1939, the restaurant was started as a roadside food corner by a person named Haji Mohammad Hossain. Later on, the business took dramatic change and became part of the culture of Dhaka city.

== History ==
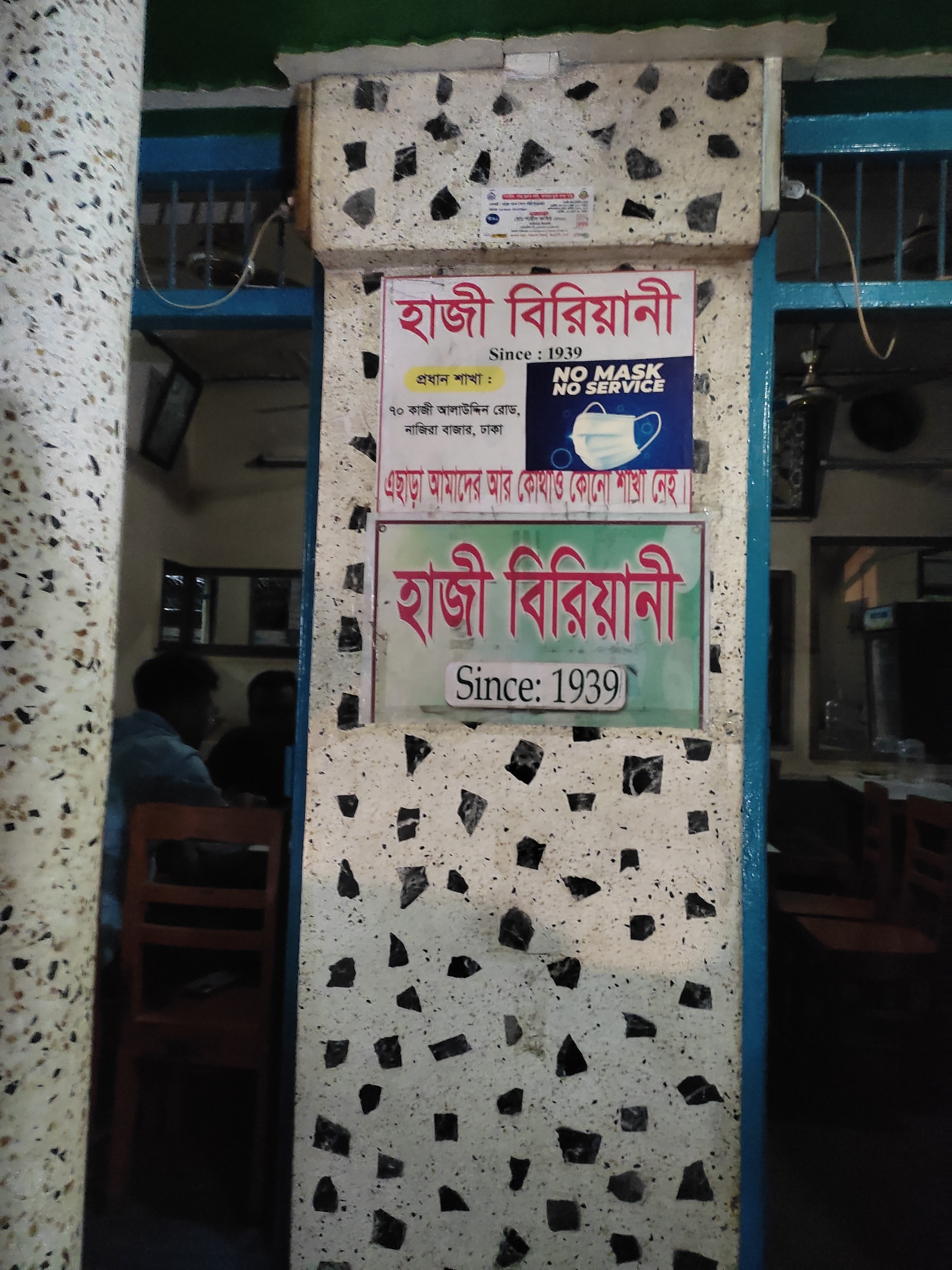
Main branch, Nazirabazar, Puran Dhaka

The business was started in 1939 by a cook, Haji Mohammad Hossain. After Haji Mohammad Hossain died in 1992, his son, Haji Mohammad Golam Hossain, took over and continued the family business without making any changes in style or tradition. Over time, Haji Mohammad Golam became tired of running the family business and finally handed over the business to his son, Haji Mohammad Shahed. The dish bears resemblance to Yemeni haneeth.

== Location ==
The Haji biryani has three branches. One is in Old Dhaka which is the main branch, one is in Motijheel, Another branch is said to be planned in Jamuna Future Park. In Old Dhaka, it is located at 70 Kazi Alauddin Road, Nazira Bazar.

== Recipe ==
The recipe includes highly seasoned rice, chevon, mustard oil, garlic, onion, black pepper, saffron, clove, cardamom, cinnamon, salt, lemon, doi (yogurt), peanuts, cream, raisin and small amount of cheese (either cow or buffalo). The recipe has been handed over the founder of the restaurant to his next generation. Haji Mohammad Shahed claimed that, "I have never changed anything, not even the amount of salt".

== See also ==
- Madhur Canteen
- Star Kabab
