= Beauty Lacchi and Faluda =

Store in Dhaka, Bangladesh

- বিউটি লাচ্ছি ও ফালুদা
- Formation: 15 June 1922; 104 years ago
- Founder: Abdul Aziz
- Founded at: 30/1 Johnson Road, Dhaka
- Type: Confectionery store
- Location: Bangladesh
- Coordinates: 23.7130921°N 90.4114408°E
- Products: Lassi, Lemonade, Falooda, Biryani
- Owner: Mohammad Manik Hossain and Jabed Hossain

Beauty Lacchi and Faluda is a store that was established on 15 June 1922 in Dacca, Bengal Presidency, British Raj (now Dhaka, Bangladesh). It was opened by Abdul Aziz in the purpose of selling Lassi and Lemonade.

Making of Lassi at its Nazirabazar branch

== History ==
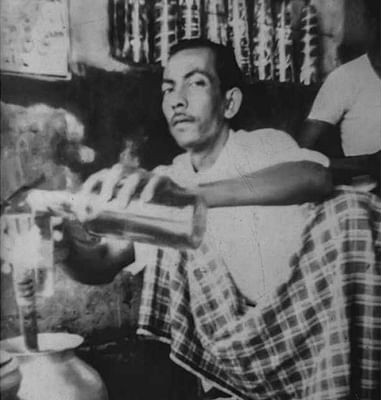
Abdul Aziz, the founder.

In 1922, Beauty Lacchi and Faluda was established. After the partition of India, Abdul Aziz, who was its founder, moved its temporary shop in 30/1 Johnson Road, Dhaka. After the death of the founder, his son Mohammad Abdul Gaffar became its next proprietor. In 2000, Falooda and five years later some other items were added. After Mohammad Abdul Gaffar, Mohammad Manik Hossain and Jabed Hossain, his two sons, got the ownership of the shop in 2001. Due to the COVID-19 pandemic, Beauty Lacchi and Faluda was closed on 26 March 2020. It then opened in June but closed again due to lack of customers. It was then reopened around September.

== Branches and products ==
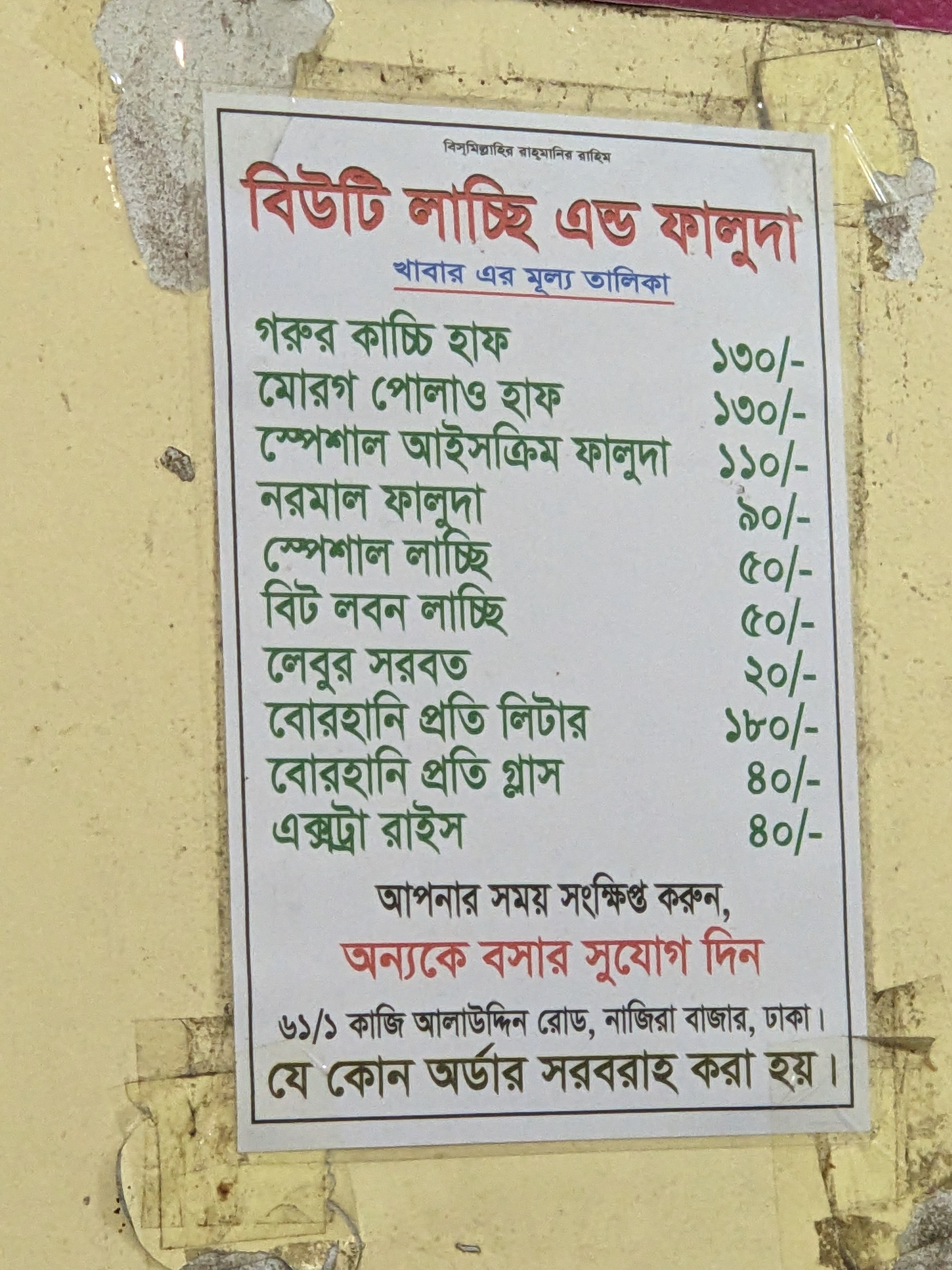
Item list in Nazirabazar branch (February 2023)

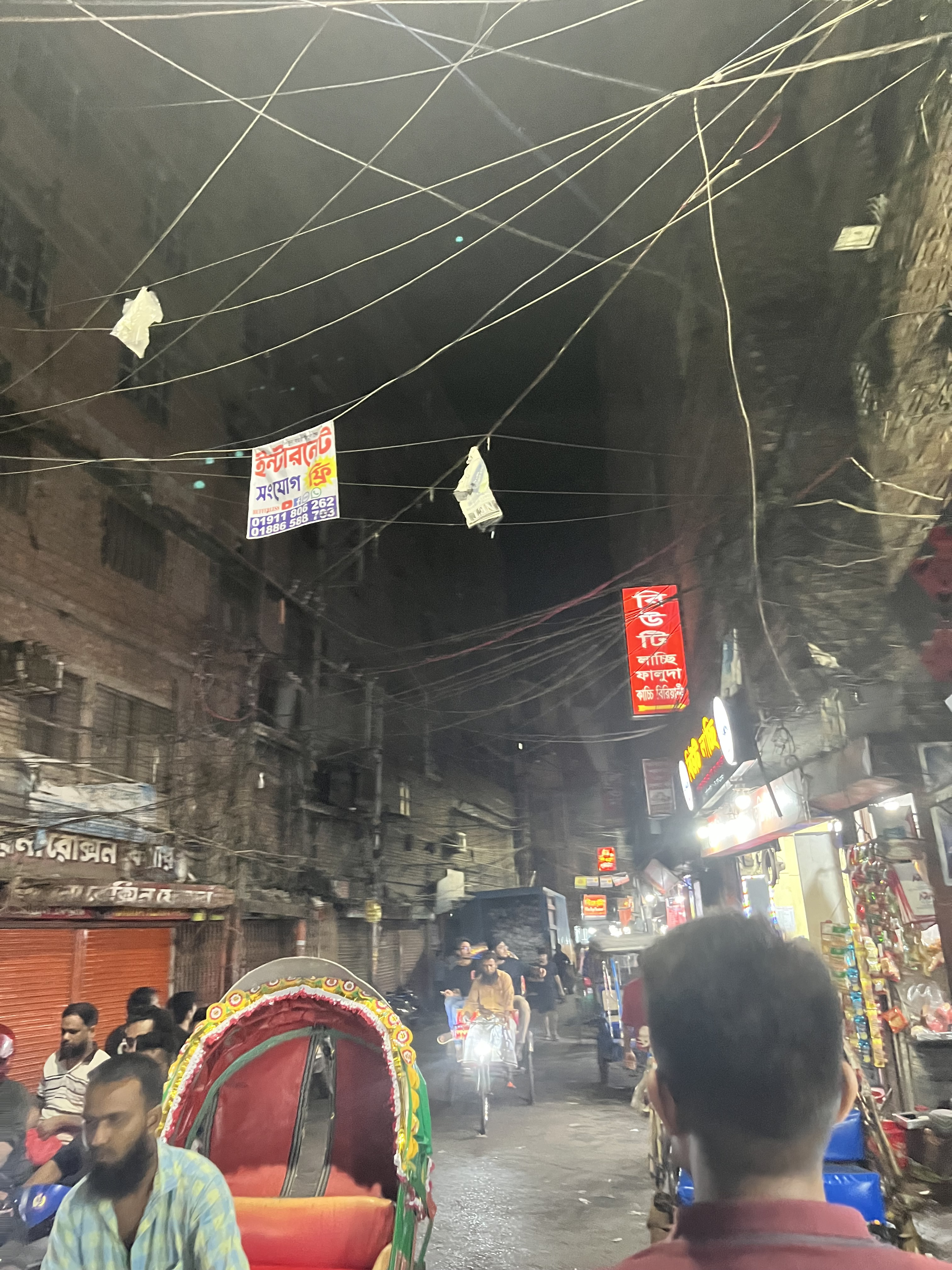
Beauty Lacchi branch at Nazirabazar

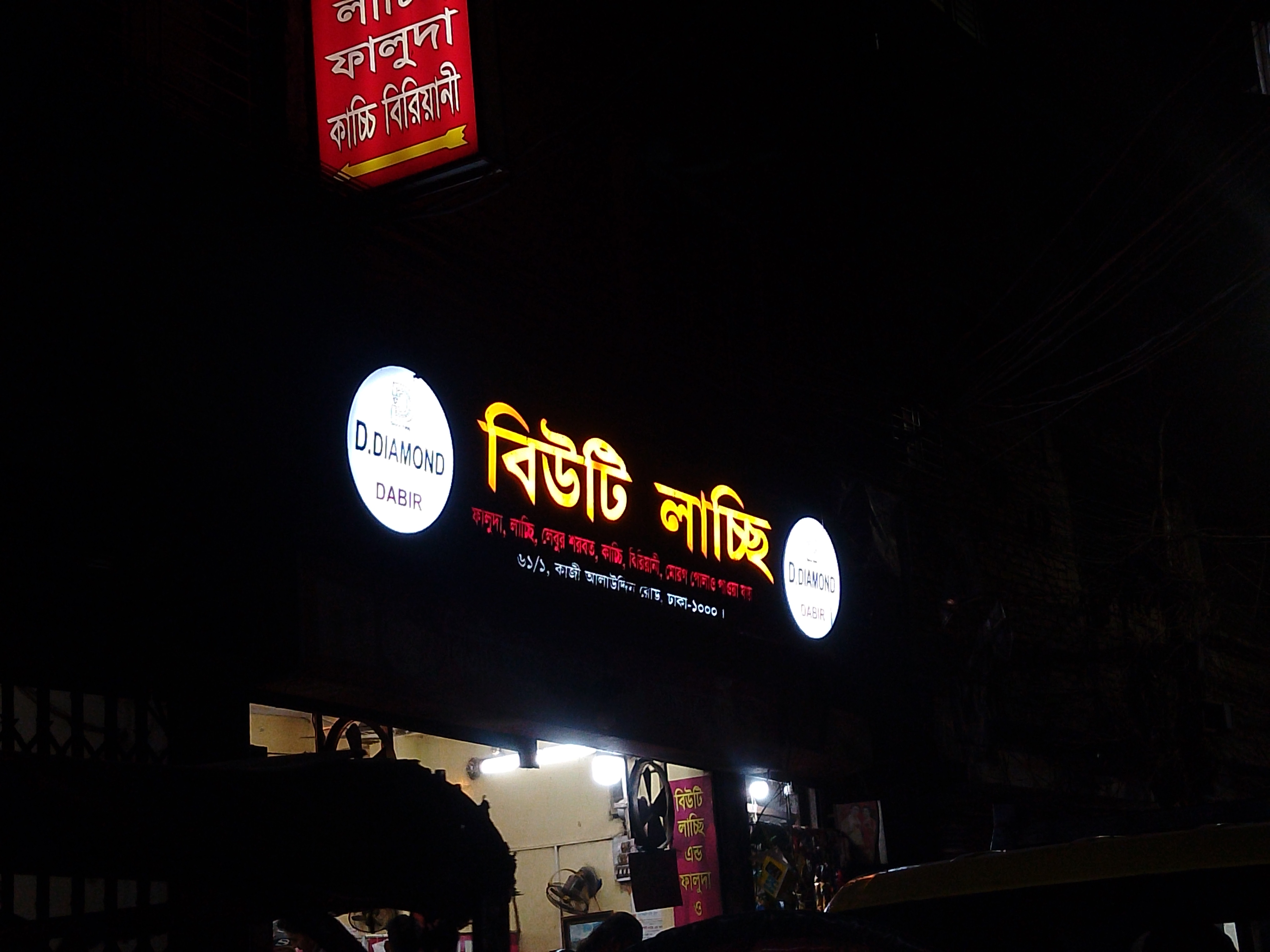
Beauty Lacchi branch at Alauddin Road

With the original store in Johnson Road, it opened more two branches in Nazirabazar and Lalbagh Thana. Previously, only branches at Johnson Road and Nazirabazar are open. Later on, a third branch was opened at Luxmibazar.

It offers five items including Sweet lassi, Salted lassi, Falooda, and Lemonade. Its Lemonade, the most popular item of the shop, is made from lemon, ice, sugar and salt. Its Nazirabazar branch sells Biryani.

== Gallery ==
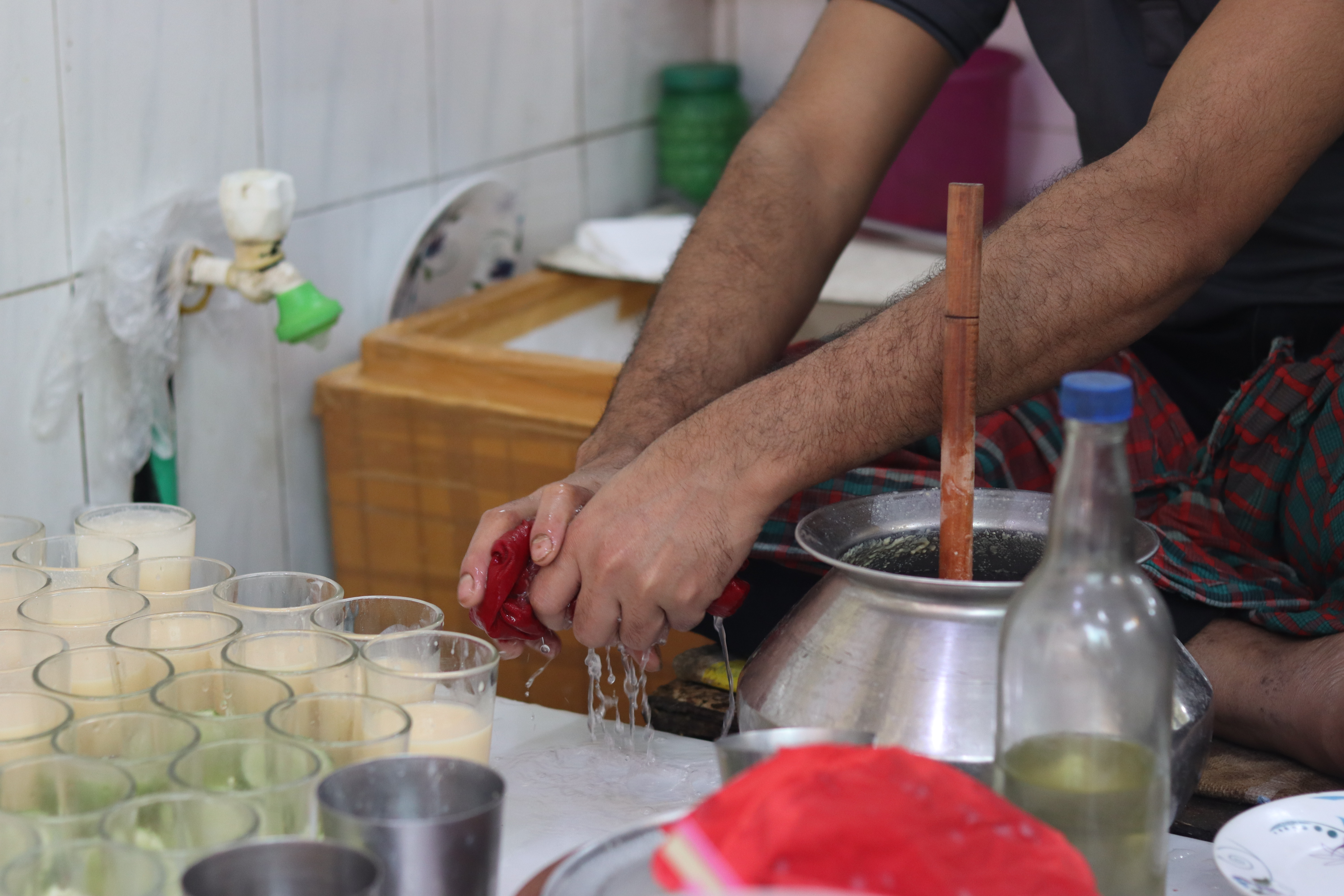
Lassi preparation

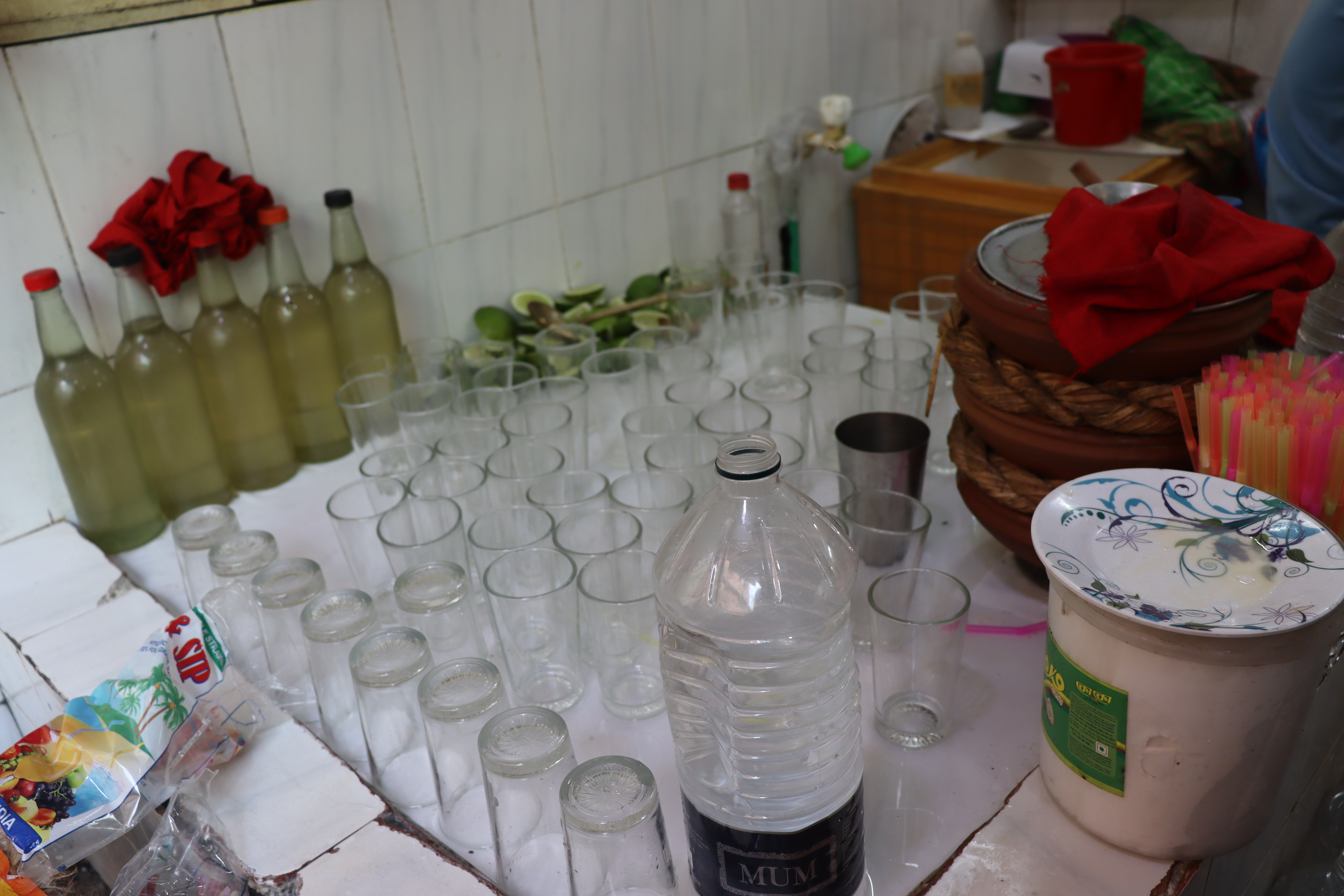
Glasses in the Nazirabazar branch

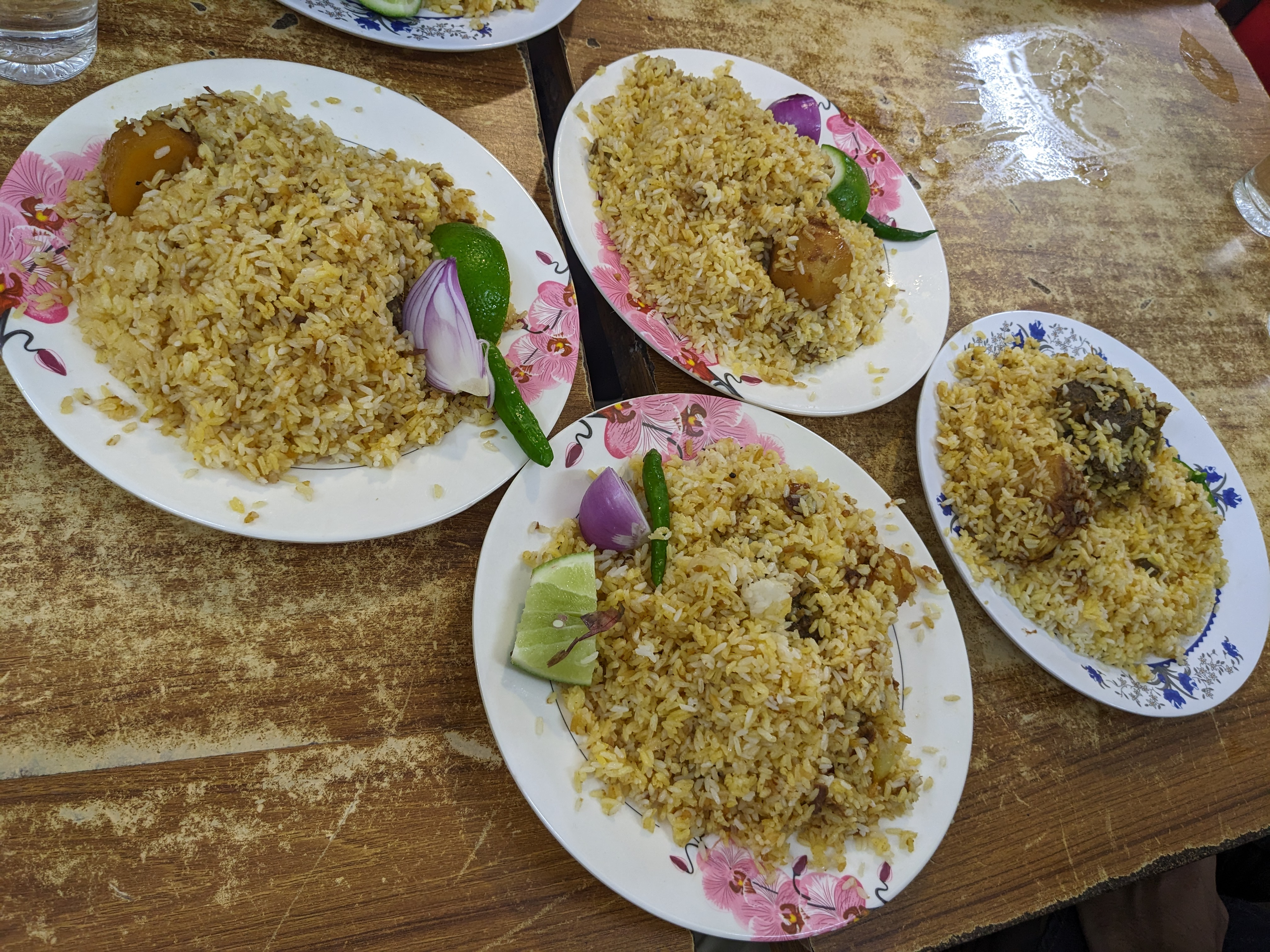
Biryani in Beauty Lacchi

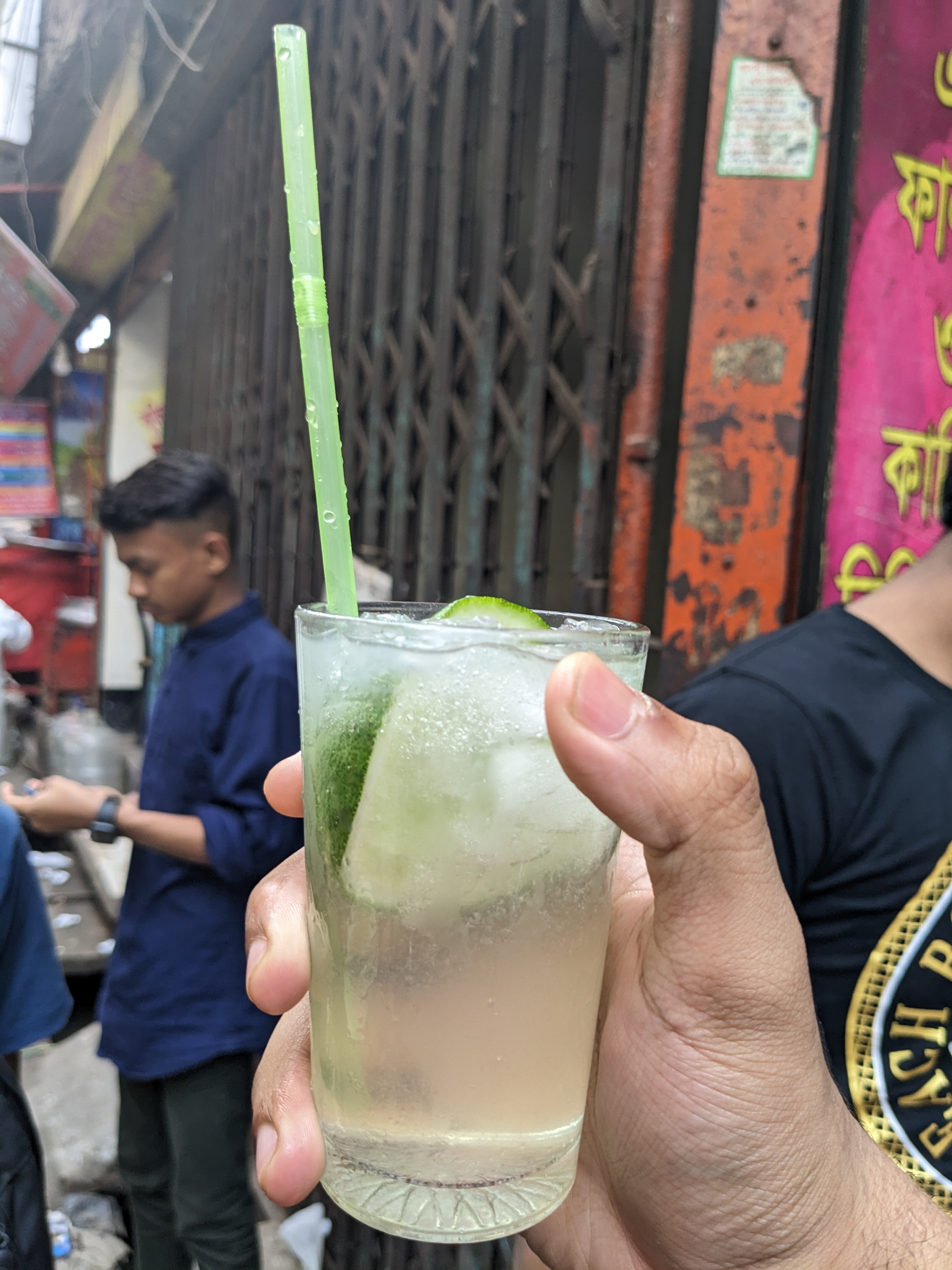
Lemonade in Beauty Lacchi
