= Shrine of Gulab Shah =

Shrine in Dhaka, Bangladesh

- গোলাপ শাহের মাজার
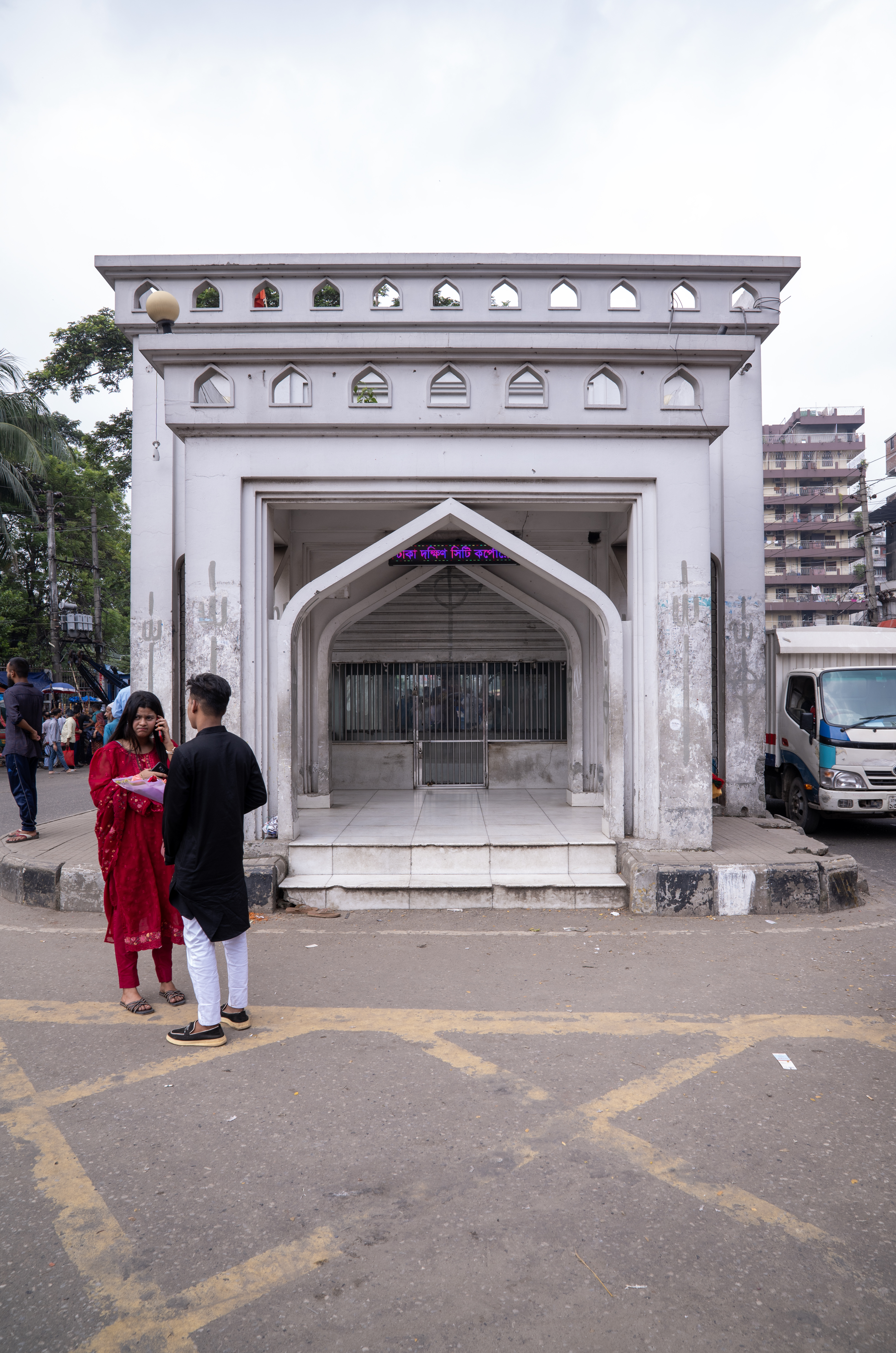
- Gulab Shah's shrine in 2024

- Location within Dhaka Location within Dhaka division Location within Bangladesh

Religion
- Affiliation: Islam
- District: Dhaka

Location
- Location: Gulistan, Dhaka
- Country: Bangladesh
- Interactive map of Shrine of Gulab Shah
- Coordinates: 23.72507°N 90.4060479°E

Architecture
- Type: Shrine

Shrine of Gulab Shah is an Islamic shrine situated at Shahid Nazrul Islam Avenue, Gulistan, Dhaka, Bangladesh. It is under the management of Dhaka South City Corporation. The shrine has two tombs, said to be Gulab Shah and his brother, both accessible from the north. Its former name is Neemgachwala Mazar. The shrine had a temporary mosque which was moved near Osmani Park in the 1980s.

The shrine's origin is unknown. Historians say it started as a grave of unknown people and later people started to visit it believing that it held a spiritual leader. According to legends, Gulab Shah was a spiritual leader who came to British India from Yemen or Iraq in the 19th century. He looked after the grave and after his death he was buried beside it. Later, the shrine became known as the Shrine of Gulab Shah.

The shrine is popular to newlyweds who believe that visiting the shrine would bring positivity to their life. Mehfil is held annually here on Sha'ban 19. In 2013, Dhaka South City Corporation started to extend the shrine which resulted in negative reactions as the shrine's background is unknown and questionable. As of 2023, it gets around ৳0.9 million every month from followers of Gulab Shah. It is alleged that local political leaders get money from donations collected at the shrine.

In 2024, after the July Revolution, incidents of Islamic shrine and Dargah demolitions took place in various parts of the country. At that time, a Facebook event was created for the demolition of the shrine, in which about 22,000 users expressed interest. Fearing that the shrine might be demolished, on September 10 it's devotees held a protest to protect it.
