= Bibi Mariam Cannon =

- বিবি মরিয়ম কামান
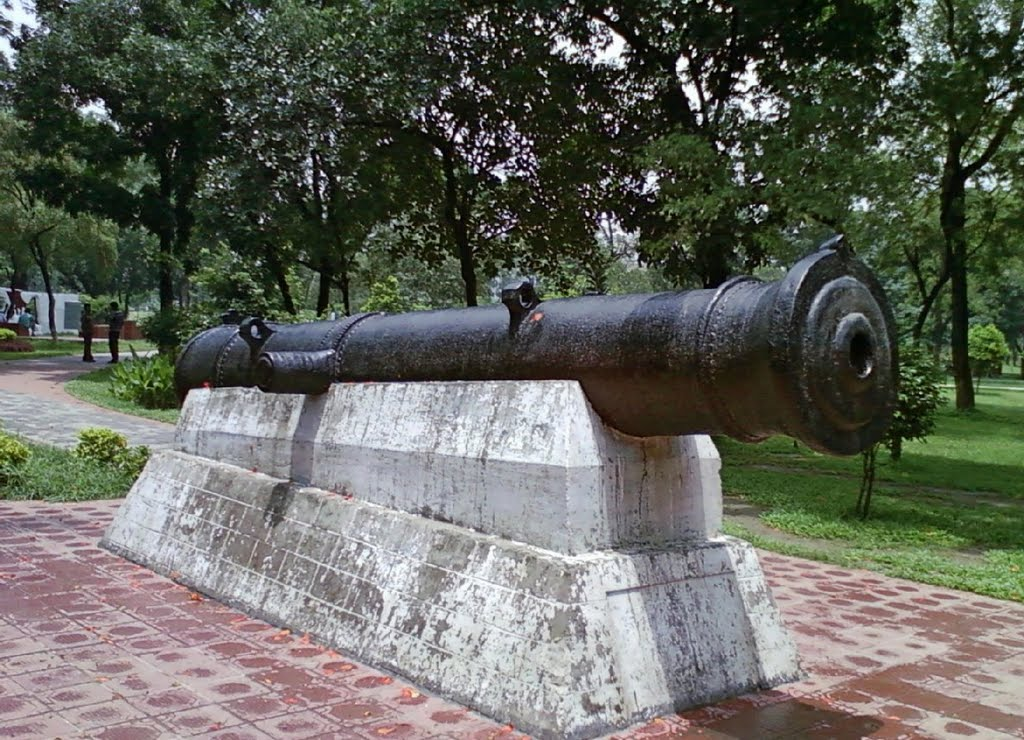
- Bibi Mariam at Osmani Udyan, Dhaka
- Interactive map of Bibi Mariam Cannon
- Location: Dhaka, Bangladesh
- Type: Cannon
- Material: Wrought Iron
- Completion date: 17th century

The Bibi Mariam Cannon (Bengali: বিবি মরিয়ম কামান) is a large early modern artillery piece on display on the grounds of the Dhaka Gate in Dhaka, Bangladesh. The cannon dates from the 17th century.

== History ==
The cannon was manufactured by local technicians on the orders of Mir Jumla II, the Mughal governor of Bengal under Emperor Aurangzeb. It was one of two large cannons; the other was the "Kalay Khan Jam Jam". The two cannons were given male and female names. They were used during Mir Jumla's invasion of Assam and later placed in front of the Bara Katra to ward off Arakanese pirates. The Bibi Mariam Cannon survived, but its male counterpart was lost. In 1832, the British administration moved the Bibi Mariam from Bara Katra to the Chowk Bazaar area of Old Dhaka. It was later moved to Gulistan during the East Pakistan period and to the Osmani Udyan in 1983. After 40 years the cannon was moved from Osmani Udyan to its present location near Dhaka Gate.

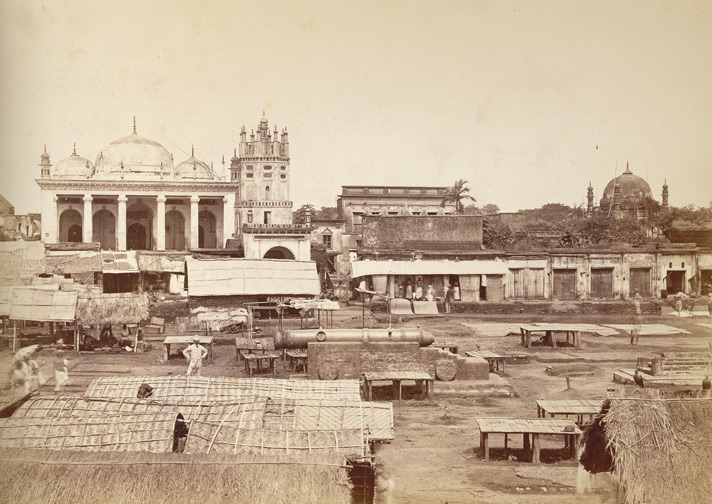
Bibi Mariam Cannon located in front of Chawk Mosque in 1885

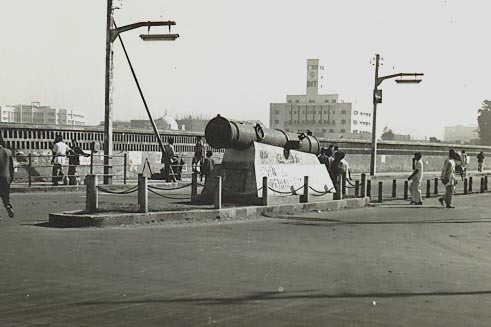
Bibi Mariam Cannon at Gulistan in late 1950s

== See also ==
- List of the largest cannon by caliber
