= Dhaka Gate =

Coordinates: 23.7286°N 90.4000°E

- মীর জুমলা গেট
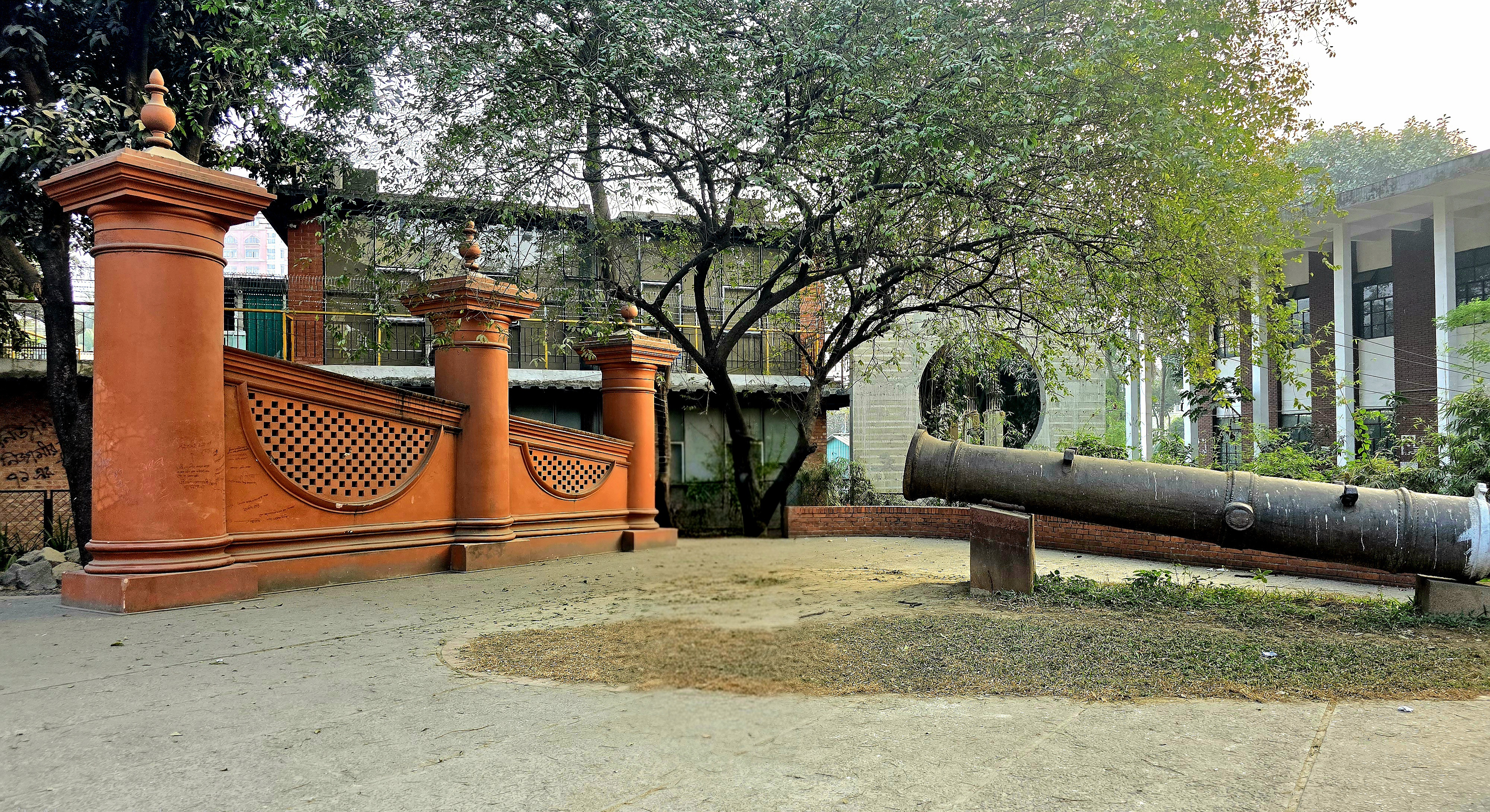
- Dhaka Gate in 2026
- Interactive map of the Dhaka Gate area

General information
- Type: Historical City Gate
- Architectural style: Mughal architecture
- Location: Dhaka, Bangladesh
- Completed: 17th-century

Height
- Height: 7-15 Fit

Design and construction
- Architect: Mir Jumla II

Dhaka Gate also known as Mir Jumla's Gate or Ramna Gate is a monument believed to be built by Mir Jumla II and enlisted as one of the oldest Mughal architectures in Dhaka. This gate is considered as an integral part of the history of Dhaka.

According to popular belief, during the reign of Mughal emperor Aurangzeb, Dhaka was expanding. Mir Jumla constructed the gate as the north entrance of the city, ascertaining the northern border of Dhaka with it.

The gate was once a remarkable piece of Mughal architecture in Dhaka and was used to enter the city after arriving on the bank of Buriganga River. The gate was probably meant to guard the city from the north from the attacks of Magh pirates. It was severely damaged and later rebuilt by magistrate Charles Dawes in 1825 AD. It is currently in the University of Dhaka campus area near Curzon Hall and Shishu Academy. One of its three parts is now in the area of Centre for Renewable Energy Research and another part stands inside the premises of Mausoleum of three leaders.

== Background ==
Islam Khan was appointed as the Subahdar of Bengal by Mughal Emperor Jahangir in 1606 AD. Islam led a successful campaign against the Baro Bhuiyans and shifted the capital of Bengal to Dhaka and gave it the name Jahangirnagar in 1610 AD. Dhaka emerged as the twelfth largest city of the world in the 17th century.

Shah Shuja, the second son of Mughal Emperor Shahjahan, who was appointed as the Subahdar of Bengal province in 1651 AD, shifted the capital of Bengal to Rajmahal from Dhaka. In 1658 AD Emperor Shahjahan's sons were engaged in a rivalry that resulted in a series of battles. Shah Shuja led a campaign to Agra from Bengal and was defeated by his brother Aurangzeb. Aurangzeb sent Mir Jumla II, an expert in naval warfare to deal with Shah Shuja in the Ganges river basin of Bengal.

After Shah Shuja fled to Arakan in 1660 AD, Mir Jumla II was appointed as the Subahdar of Bengal by emperor Aurangzeb. Mir Jumla II reestablished Dhaka as the capital of Bengal province. He constructed a number of structures including roads, bridges, culverts and several forts to modernise the city.

== History ==
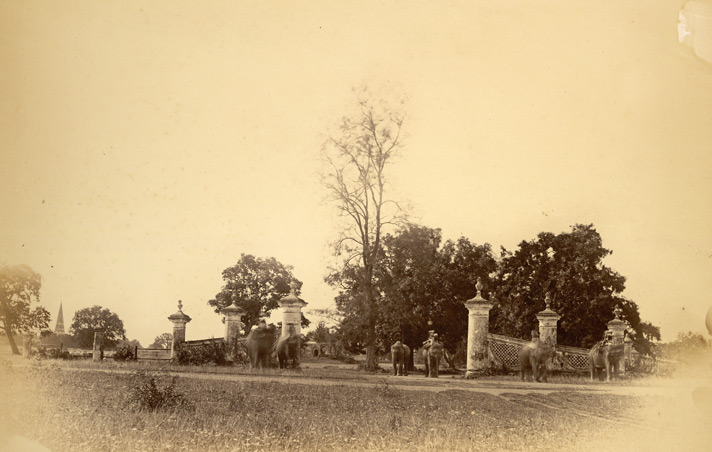
Dhaka Gate in 1875

Dhaka Gate was among the structures erected by Mir Jumla II in Dhaka according to some popular belief. It was built in Suhrawardy Udyan area which was known as the Bagh-e-Badshahi or the royal garden that time. Bagh-e-Badshahi was a large garden area built by Mughals.

After the reestablishment of Dhaka as the capital of Bengal in 1660 AD, the land area of the new city expanded rapidly. The city was expanded during the period of Mir Jumla II, stretching up to Jafarabad in the west, Postagola in the east and Tongi Bridge in the north.

A residential area was established around the gate that time. It was known as Shujatpur and Chishtia. During those days, Dhaka was frequently attacked by Magh and Portuguese pirates. It is generally believed that the gate was apparently a border of Dhaka and was built to counter the pirates.

On the other hand, many express their doubt whether the gate was actually built by Mughals or not. Renowned archaeologist Ahmad Hasan Dani examined the gate and opined that the gate we see now was built in European manner and does not match the Mughal architecture. According to Professor Dani the gate was erected in 1820s, probably on 1825 AD by Charles Dawes.

Professor Ayesha Begum of the University of Dhaka remarked that the original gate built by Mir Jumla II was probably severely damaged and magistrate Charles Dawes who was renovating the Ramna rebuilt the gate as Ramna Gate.

This gate was partly demolished when the British rulers started to build various buildings adjacent to the Suhrawardy Udyan area from 1905. The current one was erected by Lieutenant General Muhammad Azam Khan, a Martial Law Governor of East Pakistan, which too may have been relocated to its present position while widening the road.

Dhaka South City Corporation planned to renovate the Dhaka Gate to the design of archeology expert and professor Abu Sayeed M Ahmed to bring it back to its original state. Its renovation started on 24 May 2023. The renovation work is underway by 12 craftsmen at a cost of ৳7 million. Granite seats have been installed in the gate area for the visitors to sit and Bibi Mariam Cannon kept in Osmani Park has been installed near this gate. The renovation work ended on 24 January 2024. It is now open to visitors at all hours.

== Structure ==
Formerly, the Dhaka Gate, yellow in colour, consisted of three major parts: two walls and a pillar. The two walls that shape like a slide has two pillars each that helped it to stand still for 400 years. The pillar, the height of which is about 15 feet, stands between the two walls. In total the gate, once a gateway to enter into the capital Dhaka used by the Mughals, consisted of 2 pillars.

After renovation, the pillar retained its original shape, but was painted orange to reflect the widespread color scheme of Mughal architecture in Bengal. A third pillar was installed to complete the effect.

The height of the structure varies from 7 to 15 feet. But the design was uniquely made. There is a wide cornice shaped architectural work at the top of every single pillar. The two walls consist of a number of designed square holes in a half circular thickened part at the upper portion of the wall.

The architecture reflects the glory of the 400-year-old capital Dhaka.

== Gallery ==
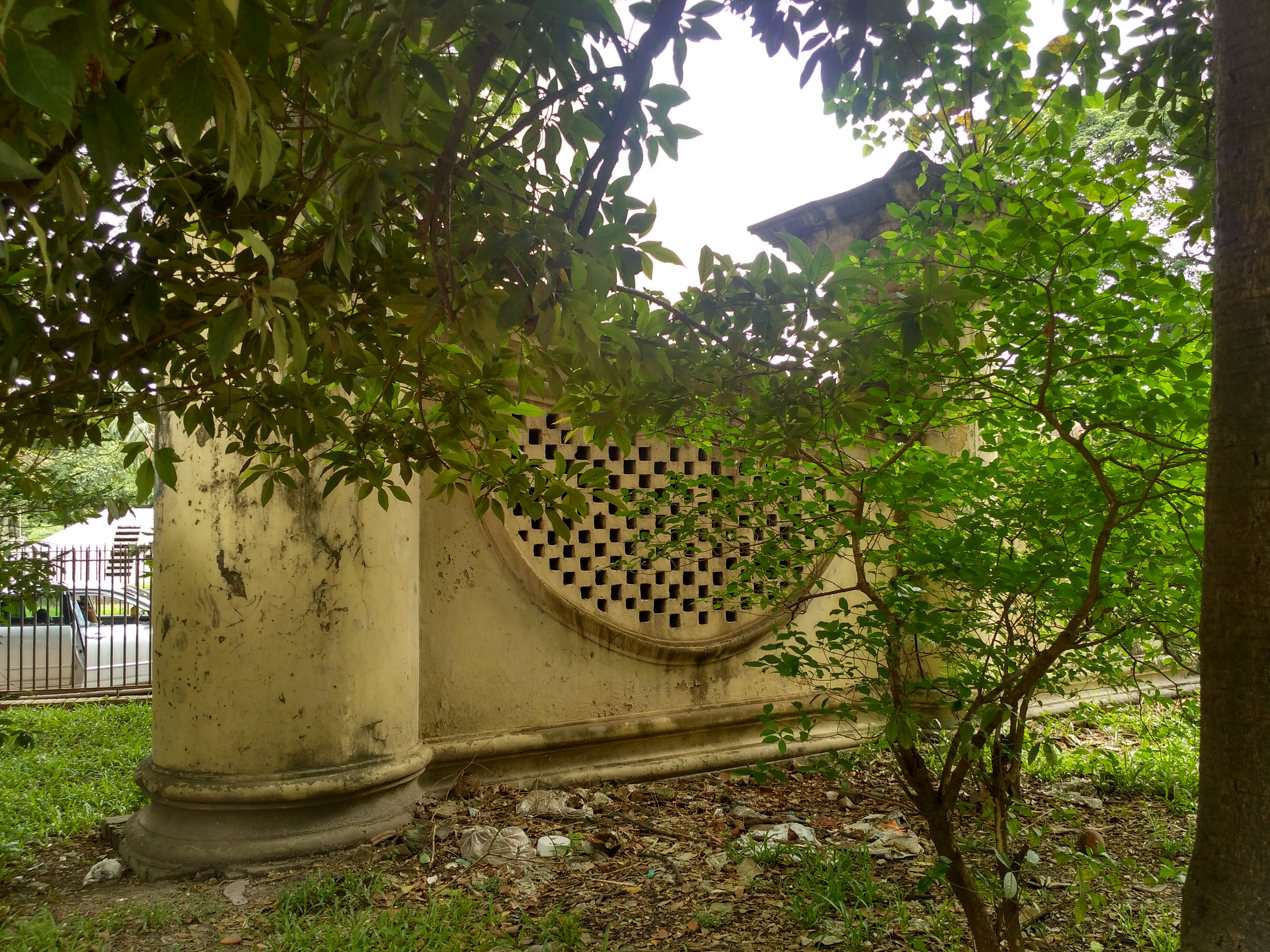

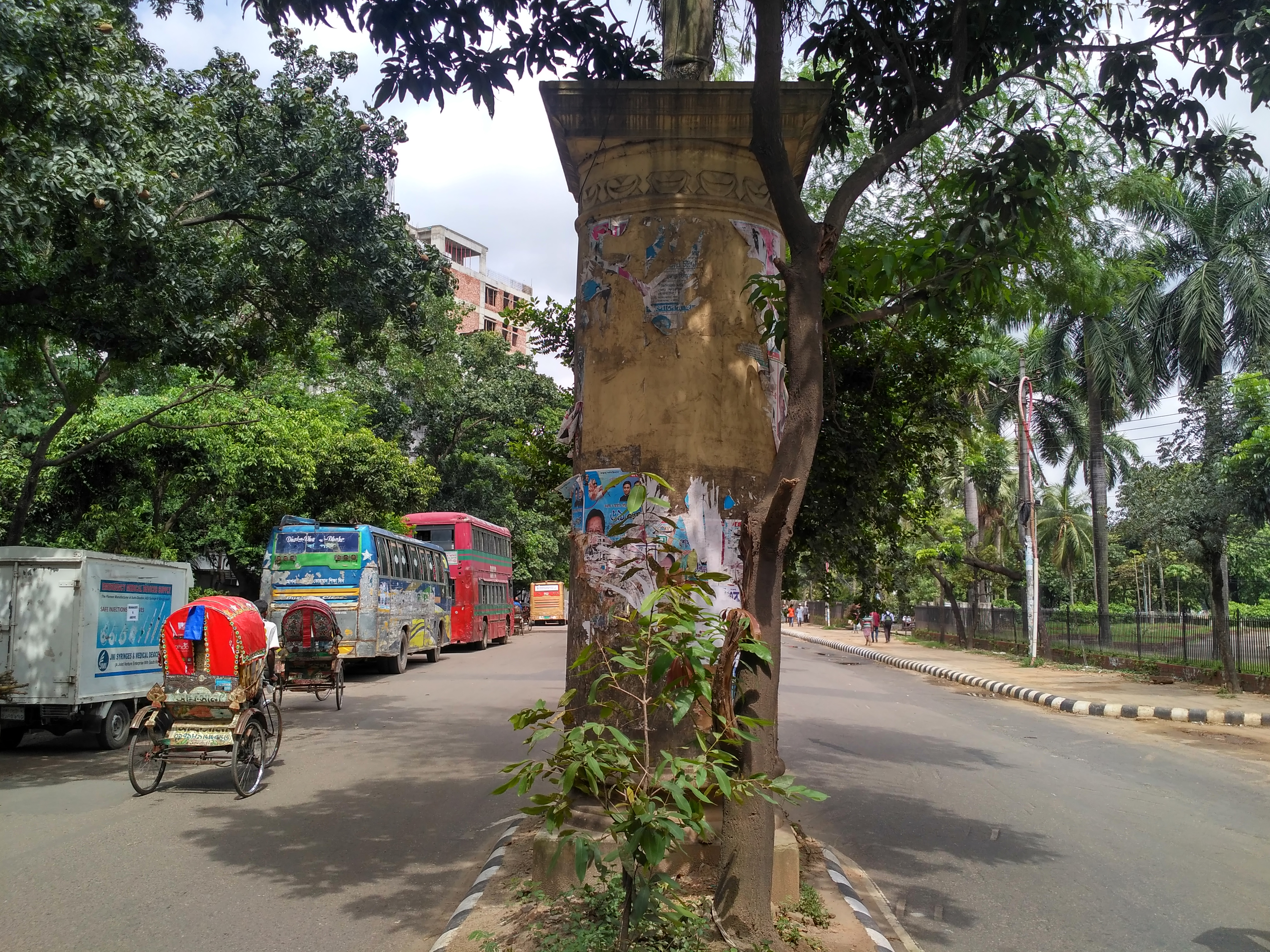
Middle part situated at the road divider
