= Gulistan Shopping Complex =

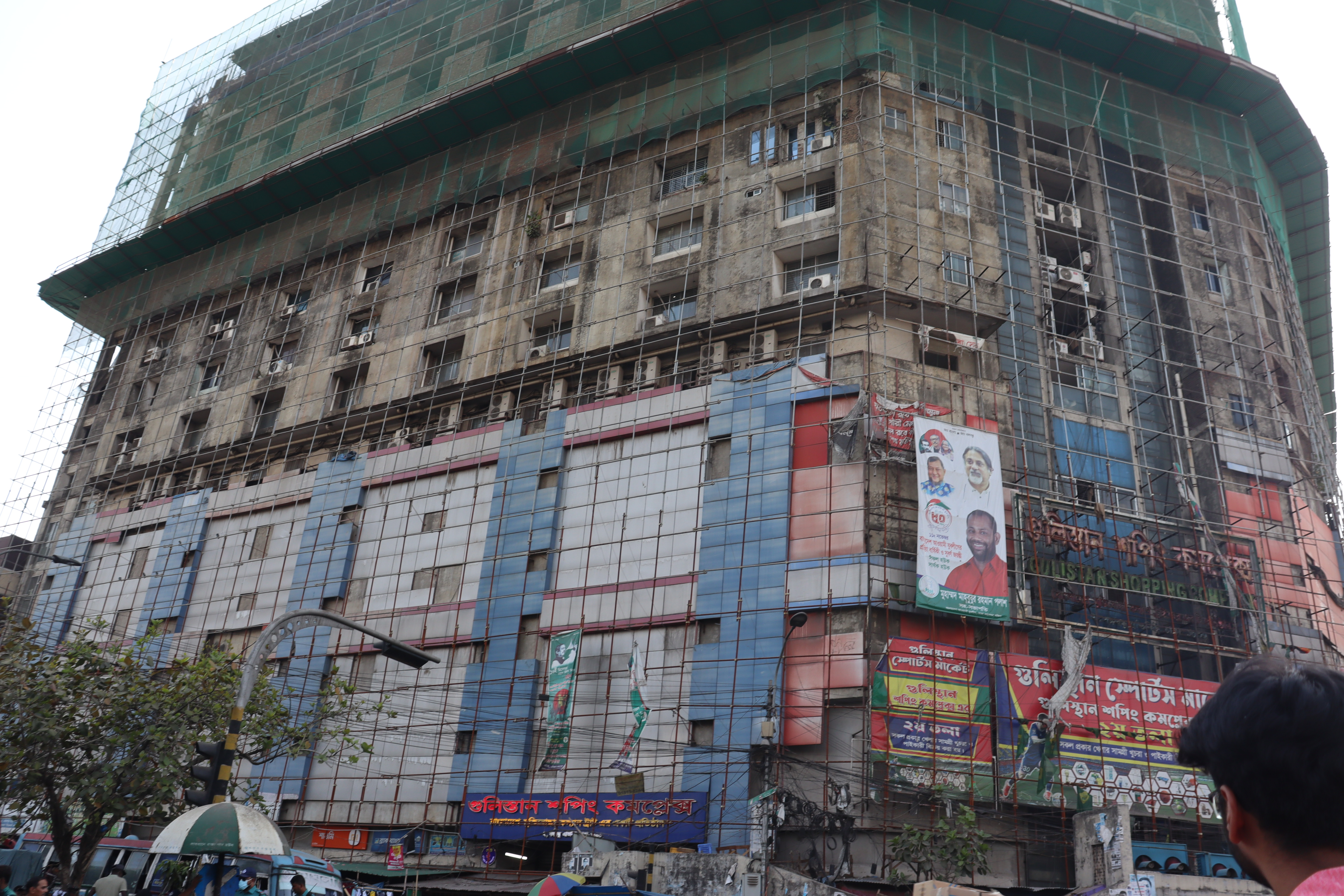
- The shopping mall in 2023
- Location: Abrar Avenue, Dhaka, Bangladesh
- Coordinates: 23.724679°N 90.4115152°E
- Opened: 2008
- Developer: Western Engineers
- Owner: Bangladesh Freedom Fighter Welfare Trust
- Num. of stores: 583
- Floor area: 19,000 square feet (1,800 m^{2})
- Floors: 20
- Public transit: Gulistan

Gulistan Shopping Complex is a shopping mall located on Abrar Avenue in Dhaka, Bangladesh. Its construction began in 2005 after the demolition of the fifty-year-old movie theater Gulistan that stood on the same site. The construction stopped in 2007, leaving the shopping mall incomplete.

== History ==
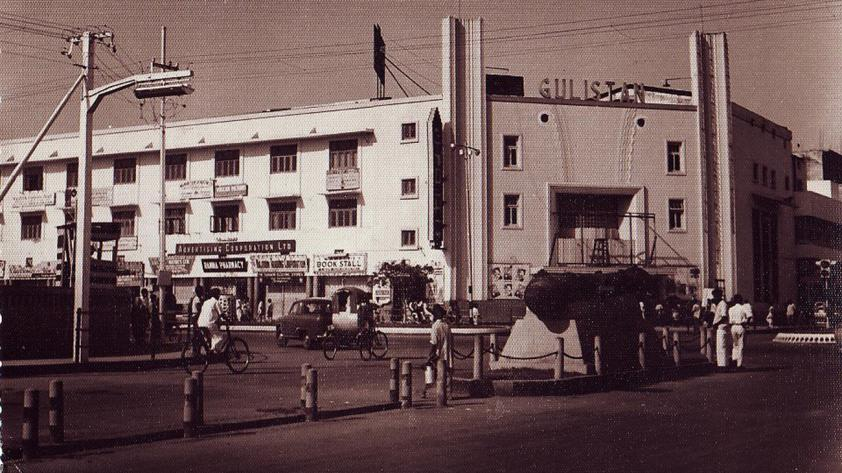
Gulistan in 1963

After the partition of India, Khan Bahadur Fazle Dosani migrated from Calcutta, India, to Pakistan and established a movie theater named Liberty in Ramna, Dacca (present-day Gulistan, Dhaka, Bangladesh), in 1952, which was later renamed "Gulistan". In 1955, another movie theater named Naaz was built on the upper floor of the theater building. After the independence of Bangladesh, Dosani left the country and moved to Pakistan, and the government acquired the movie theater in 1972. Ownership of the property was subsequently transferred to the Bangladesh Freedom Fighter Welfare Trust.

In 2001, the trust entered into a five-year agreement with Western Engineers to construct a 20-storey shopping mall on the movie theater's 0.6140-acre plot. Under the agreement, Western Engineers would sell the shops of the proposed mall, while the trust would regularly collect rent from the shops. In 2005, the appointed developer demolished the cinema building and began construction of a 20-storey shopping mall on the site.

Although the building was scheduled for completion by 2007, construction was halted midway during the period of One-Eleven. Meanwhile, the developer earned ৳3 million (equivalent to ৳9.8 million or US$80,000 in 2024) through the sale of shops. In 2012, the trust cancelled its construction agreement with the developer. As of 2025, the shopping mall is in the process of obtaining KPI clearance. At the same time, new plans have been prepared for the building, and the number of shops is being increased through reorganization.

== Status ==
According to construction plan for the shopping mall, it was to include movie theaters. However, as its construction remained incomplete, the plan was never implemented.

Under the terms of the agreement, if construction was not completed by 2007, Western Engineers would be required to pay a regular penalty of ৳50,000 to the Bangladesh Freedom Fighter Welfare Trust. Accordingly, by 2018, ৳255 million (equivalent to ৳390 million or US$3.2 million in 2024) in penalties remained unpaid. According to calculations, the trust was supposed to receive ৳20 million (equivalent to ৳31 million or US$250,000 in 2024) from shop rentals, but the organization earned only ৳1 million (equivalent to ৳1.5 million or US$13,000 in 2024).

== Corruption ==
In 2015, a meeting of a parliamentary standing committee expressed concern over irregularities and corruption related to the shopping mall and urged that the issues be resolved.

In 2019, several meetings of a parliamentary standing committee decided that warehouses and illegal structures that had been unlawfully constructed in the parking area of the building's basement floor should be demolished. The committee also called for the recovery of ৳11.9 million (equivalent to ৳17 million or US$140,000 in 2024) owed to the trust by leaseholders of the parking area.

By 2019, 343 shops had reportedly been unlawfully occupied over the last decade with the backing of influential individuals despite having legitimate owners. A commander of the Bangladesh Ansar was withdrawn after being accused of assisting occupiers by facilitating the construction of shops on the building's 10th floor for the purpose of illegal occupation.

In 2022, the Anti-Corruption Commission filed a case in court over allegations of corruption in the allocation of 158 shops. In 2024, a charge sheet was submitted to the court against the administrator of the management and two directors of the developer.

== Incidents ==
According to a 2022 report by Nagorik, the developer resumed construction work on the mall in an effort to complete it and blocked its passageways with corrugated metal fencing, causing monetary losses to shopkeepers. At the time, several shopkeepers stated that the developer was demolishing their shops and alleged that efforts were being made to resell the units. Neither the trust nor the developer accepted responsibility for the issues. One shop owner alleged that he had received threats of enforced disappearance from the administrator and officials of the mall's management if he did not repurchase his shop, and that they had shut down his business premises.

In 15 August of the same year, steel rods being transported for the completion of the shopping mall fell from its building onto the street, injuring five pedestrians.
