= Biponi Bitan =

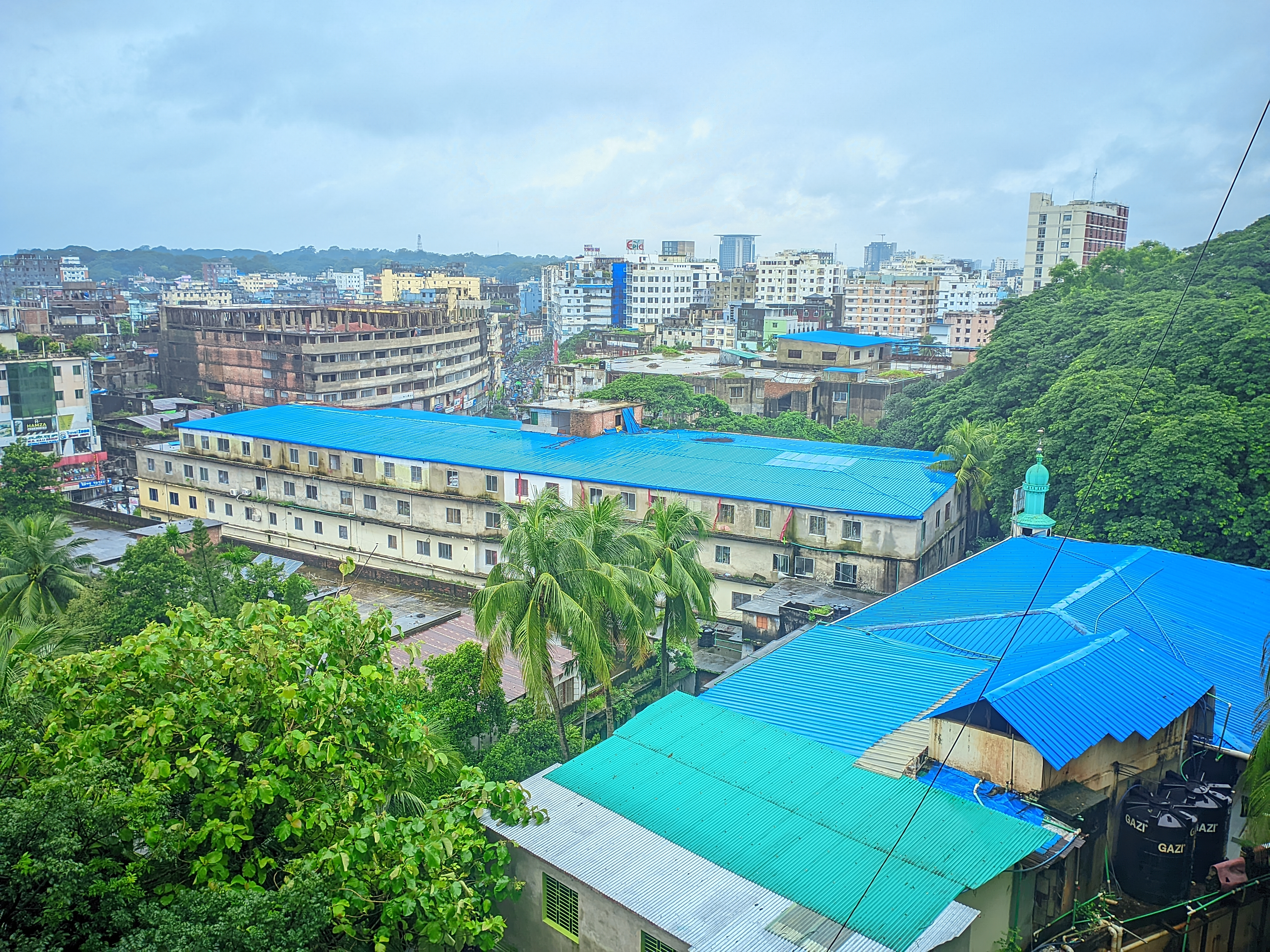
- Location: Chittagong
- Coordinates: 22.3341965°N 91.8339852°E
- Address: New Market Junction, Jubilee Road
- Opened: 1964
- Num. of stores: 512
- Floors: 4
- Parking: Yes

Biponi Bitan, commonly known as New Market, is the largest commercial shopping center in Chittagong, Bangladesh. It is located at New Market Junction on Jubilee Road in the city.

== History ==
In 1964, Biponi Bitan started its journey with 458 shops. Earlier in the 1950s Chittagong's stationary and textile stores included Wadud, Malabar Stores, Chaity Stores, Lucky Stores, Kasem Stores, Paramount Stores, Majumder Brothers, Chand Stores, Kashmir Stores and Reazuddin Bazar and Teribazar. However, these shops quickly lost popularity after the establishment of Biponi Bitan. At this time the big shops of the city were shifted to Bipani Bitan. From the post-independence period until the 1980s, Biponi Bitan was the main area along with Reazuddin Bazar.

== Structure ==
The four-story building of Biponi Bitan is divided into two blocks. As of 2023, there are approximate 512 stores. "A" block includes clothing, cosmetics, electrical appliances, cottage industries, gold and watches, shoes,
