= Rajlokkhi Complex =

Shopping mall in Uttara, Dhaka, Bangladesh

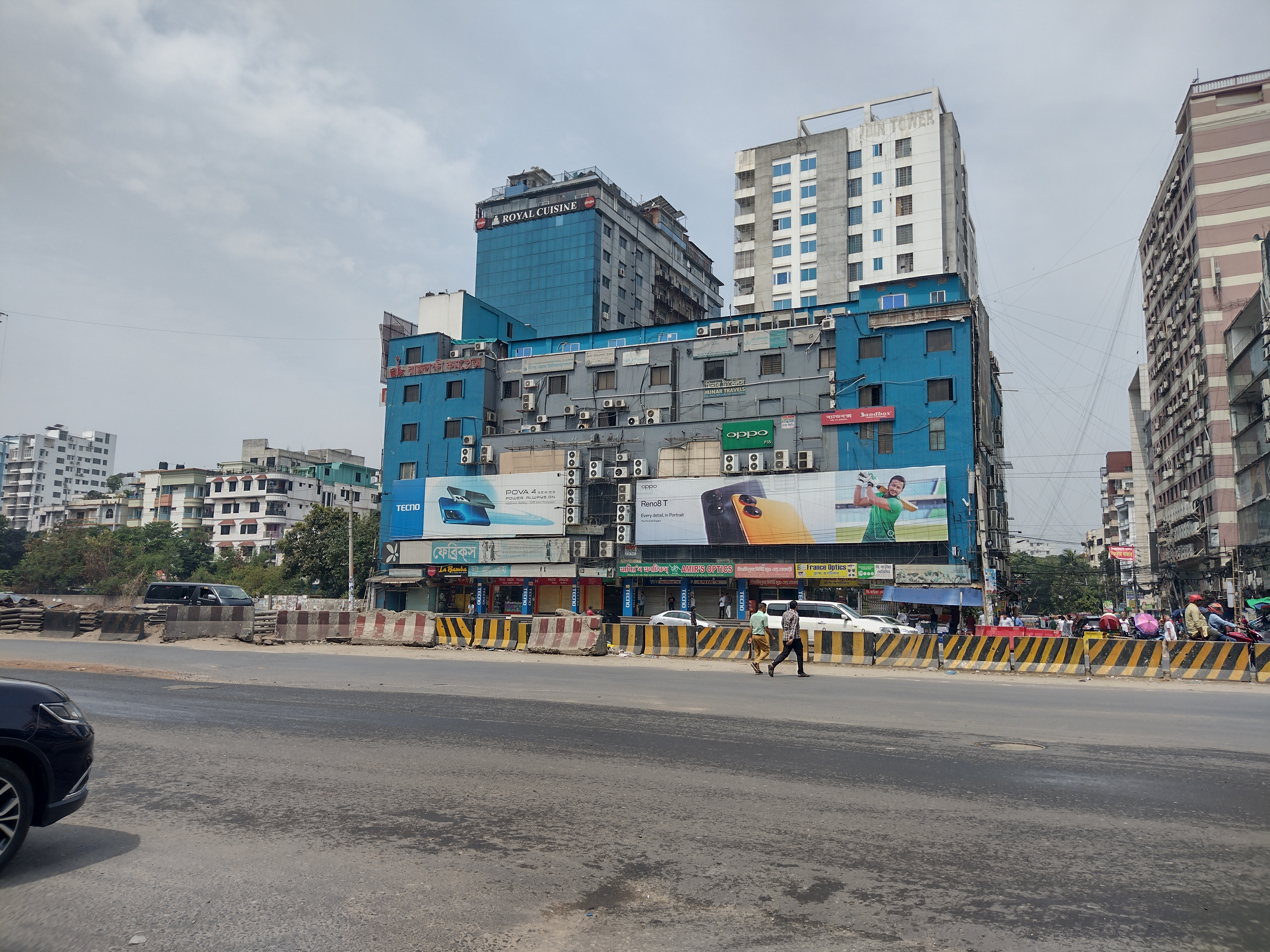
- Location: Uttara, Dhaka, Bangladesh
- Coordinates: 23.8640433°N 90.398885°E
- Opened: 1992
- Floors: 6
- Public transit: Rajlokkhi Bus stop

Rajlokkhi Complex (Bengali: রাজলক্ষী কমপ্লেক্স) (Note: Although the correct spelling should be "রাজলক্ষ্মী" (Rajlaxmi), the signboard of the building says "রাজলক্ষী" (Rajlokkhi).) is a shopping mall situated in Uttara, Dhaka. It is the oldest shopping mall in Uttara. This shopping mall is closed on Wednesday and half of Thursday.

== Location ==
Rajlokkhi complex is situated in Sector 3 of Uttara Model Town. Anyone can gain access to the shopping mall from Dhaka–Mymensingh highway. There is a bus stop in the same name.

== History ==
Bangladeshi actor Razzak started to building this shopping mall in 1986. It was originally constructing as a three-storey building which was completed after six years as a six-storey building funded by Sonali Bank. Although Razzak wanted to have a cinema hall in the building, he and his family were unable to build it due to government objections.

== Description ==
Rajlokkhi Complex is a 12,960 sq ft shopping mall. In addition to many shops and offices, there are some shop selling various products needed for the kitchen. 'Daily Shopping' retail chain has a store in Rajlokkhi Complex.

== Events ==
- On November 22, 2016, the Rajlaxmi Complex caught fire, causing minor damage.
- On February 27, 2019, thousands of people marched in the shopping mall area demanding justice for the murder of a child.
