= Shimanto Square =

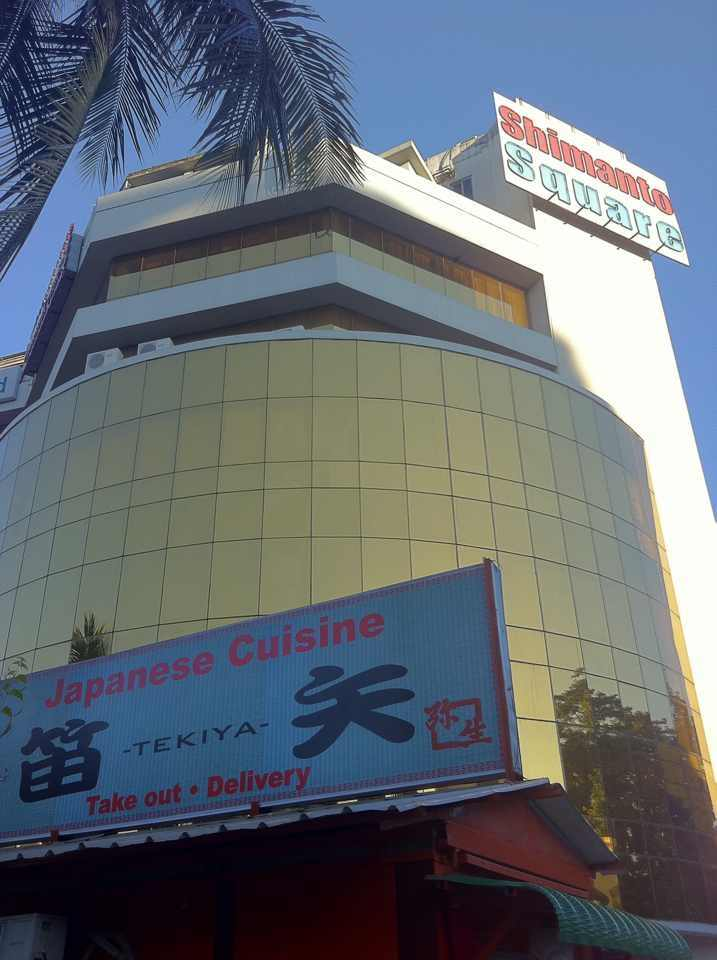
- Front of Shimanto Square
- Location: Dhaka, Bangladesh
- Coordinates: 23°44′17″N 90°22′37″E
- Address: Road no 2, Dhanmondi
- Opened: 12 November 2001
- Developer: Reed property
- Manager: Border Guard Bangladesh
- Owner: Border Guard Bangladesh
- Num. of stores: 360
- Floors: 6

Shimanto Square, formerly Rifle Square, is a shopping centre in Dhaka, Bangladesh. It is managed by Border Guard Bangladesh.

== Location ==
The complex is located at Road No. 2 of Dhanmondi, beside the headquarters of the Bangladesh Border Guard, and opposite to Dhanmondi Lake.

== About ==
Shimanto Square shopping mall has some 360 shops. It has a food court with around 16 outlets.

== Gallery ==
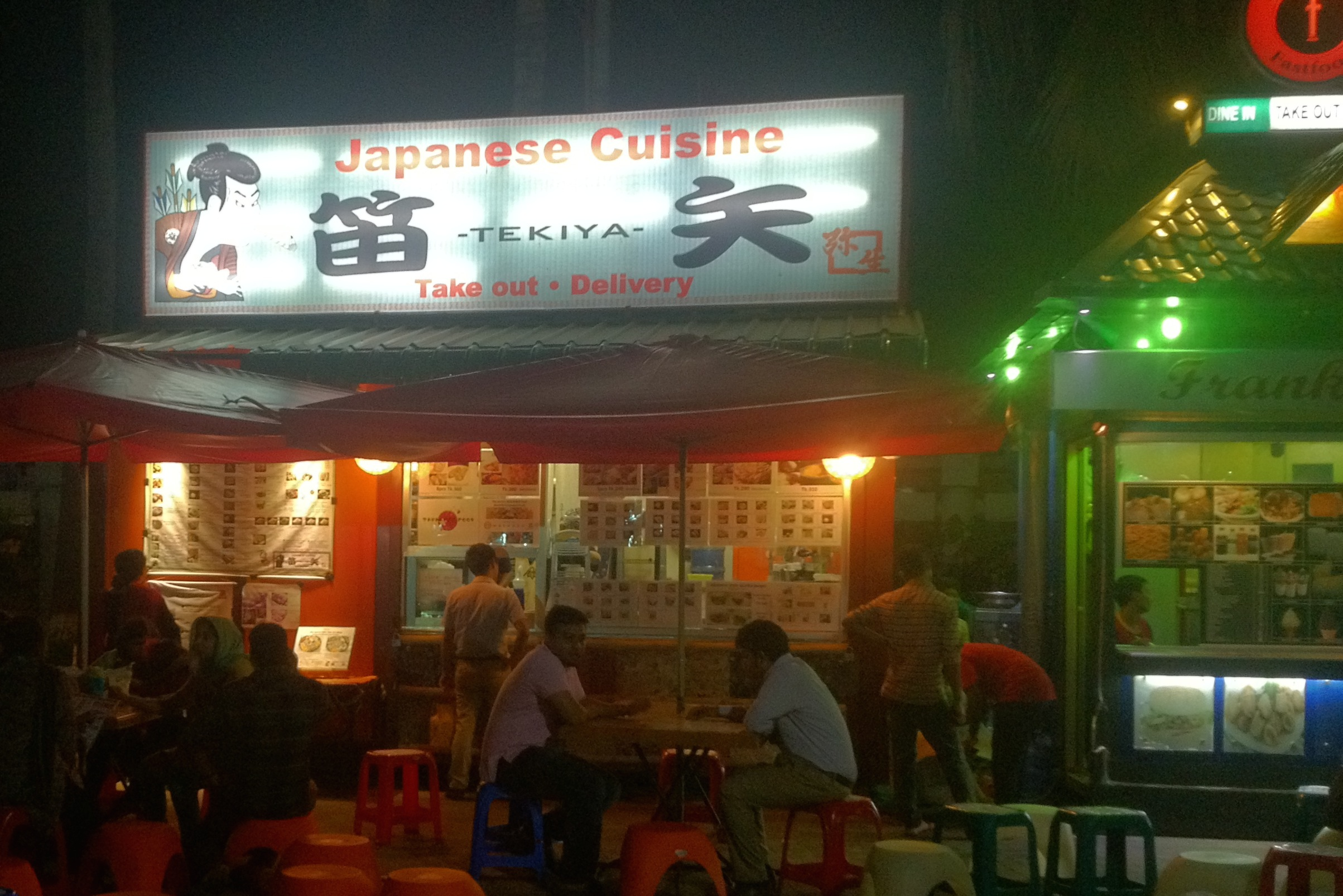
A Tekiya outlet

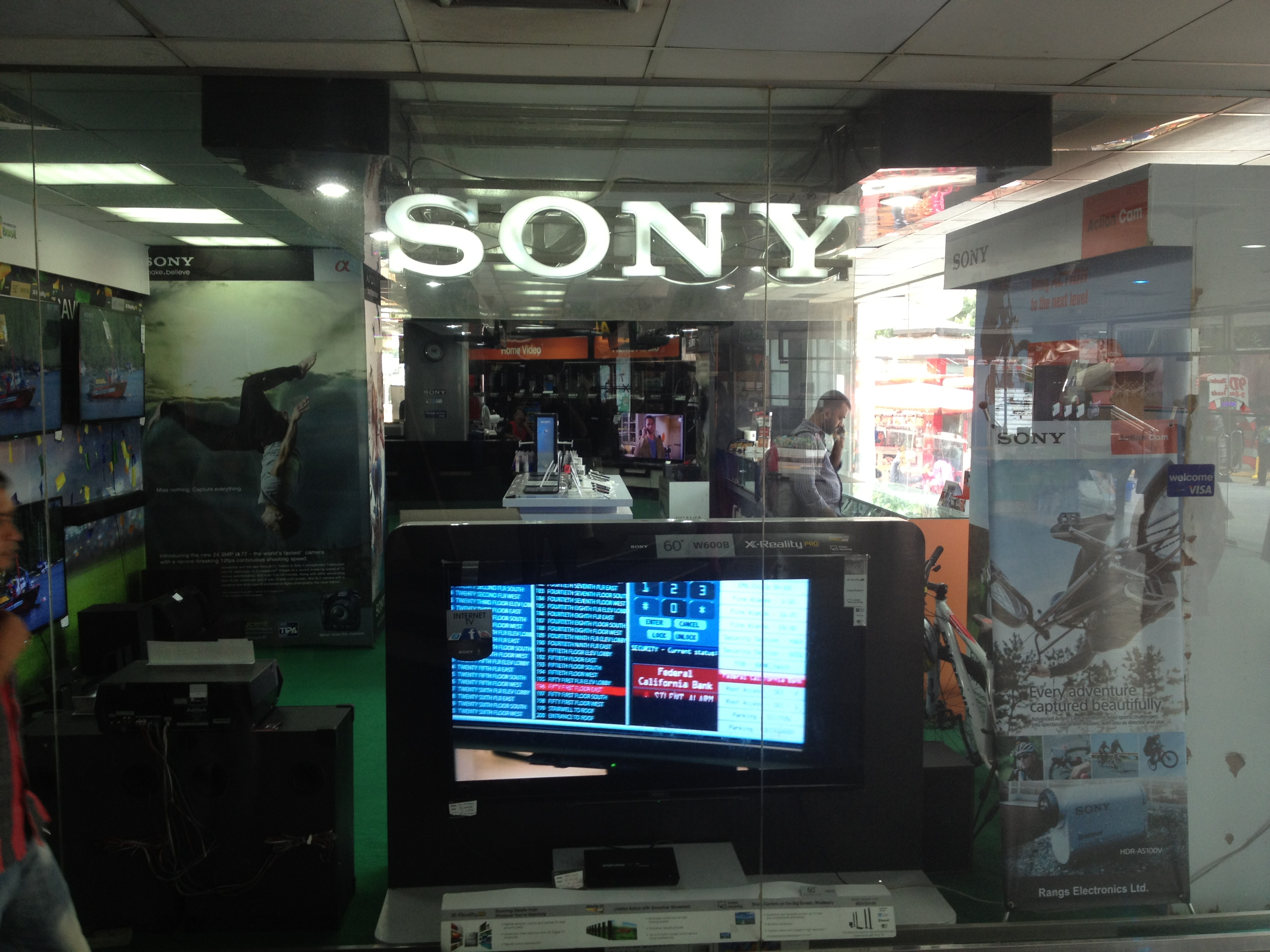
A Sony showroom

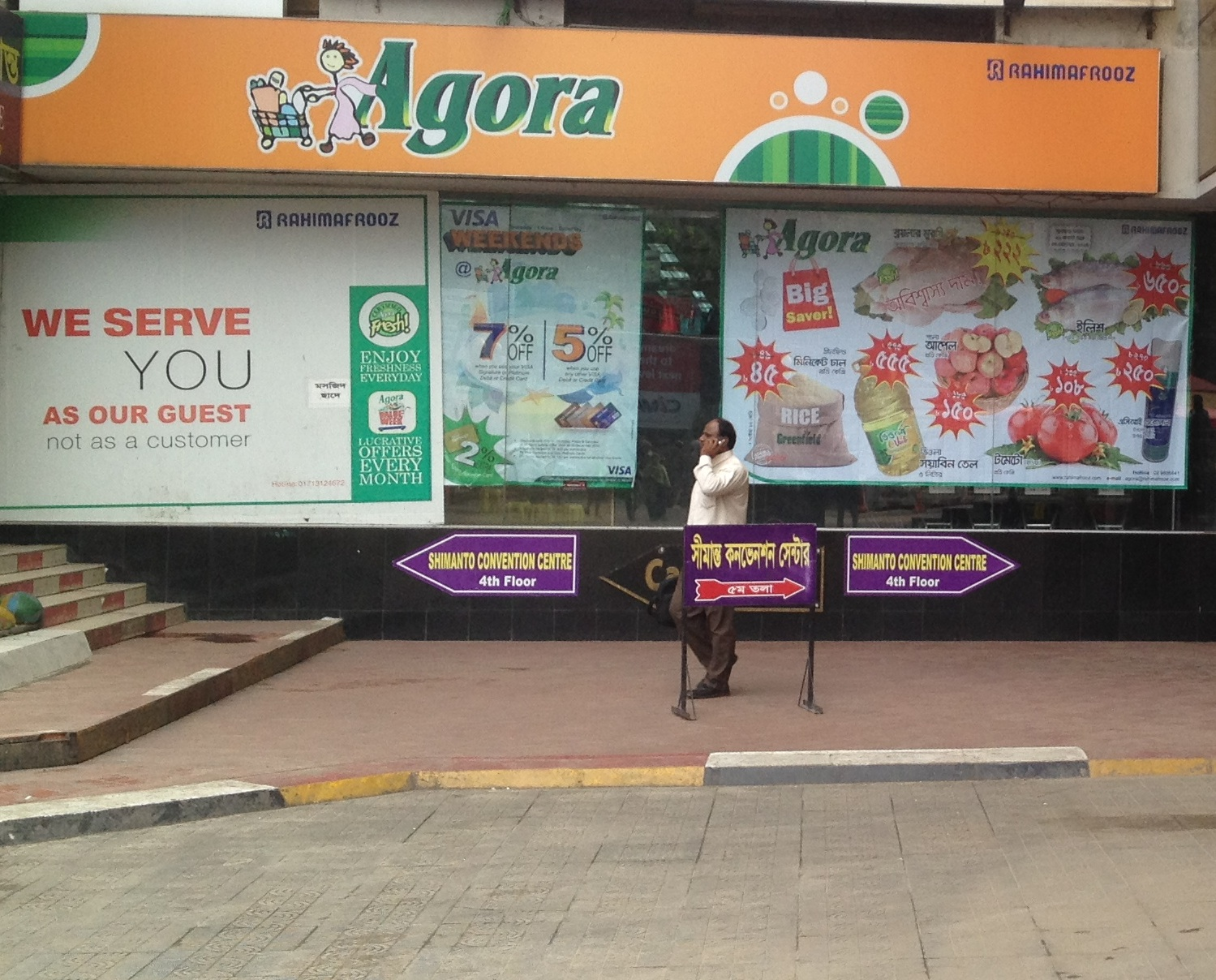
The mall's only supermarket

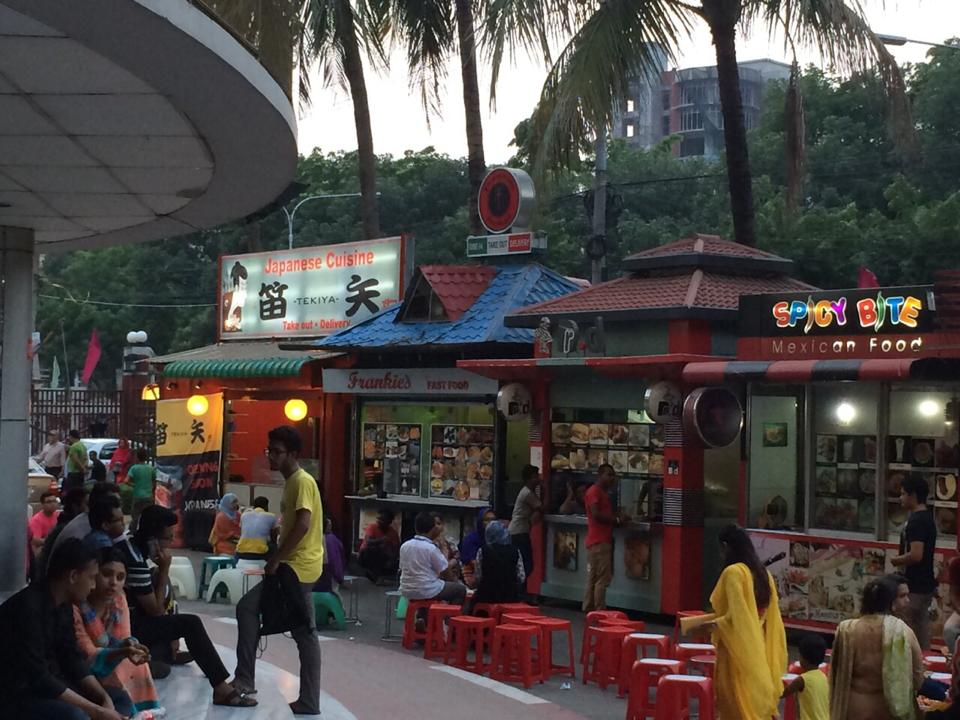
The mall's outdoor food court

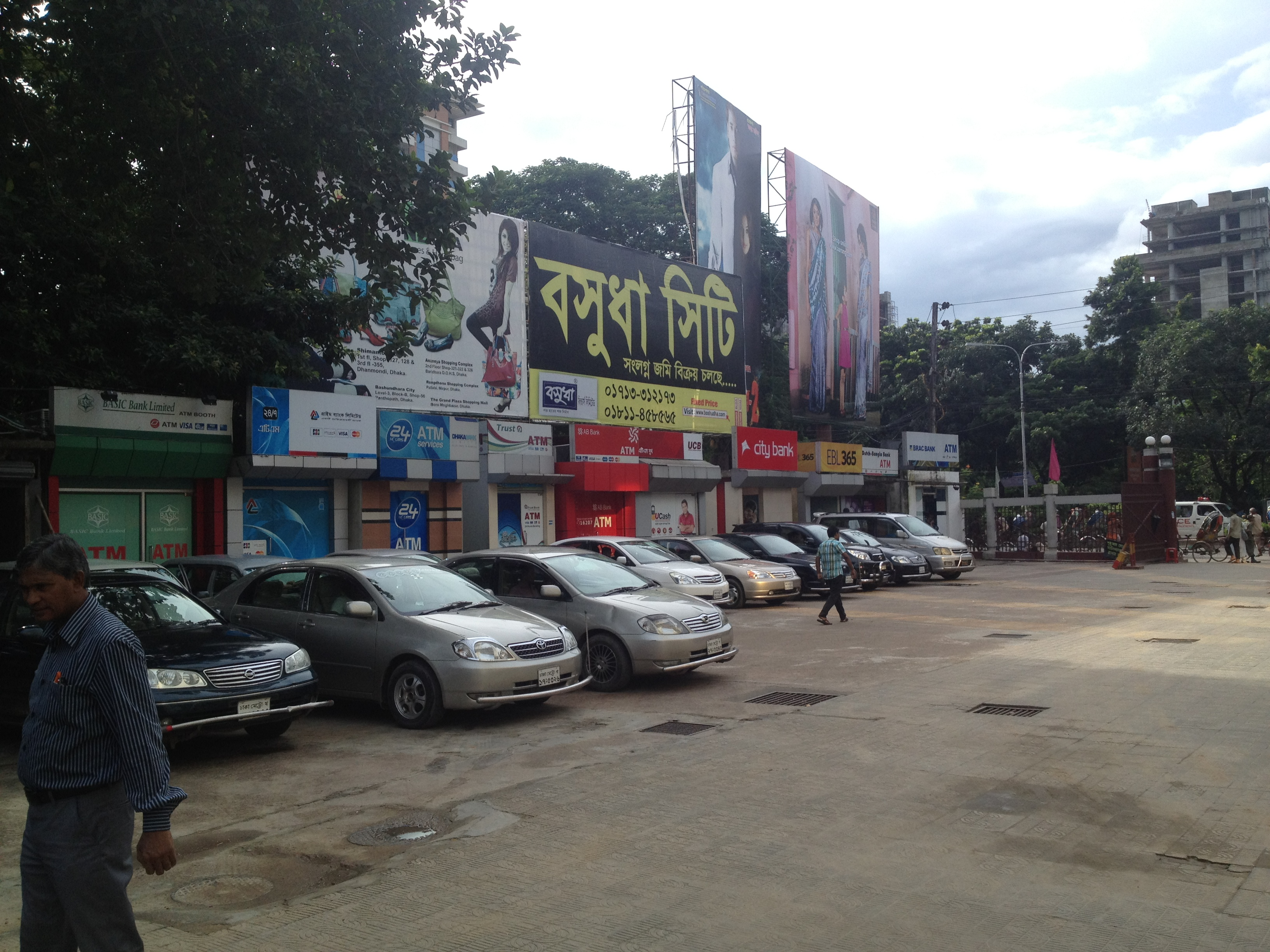
ATM booth

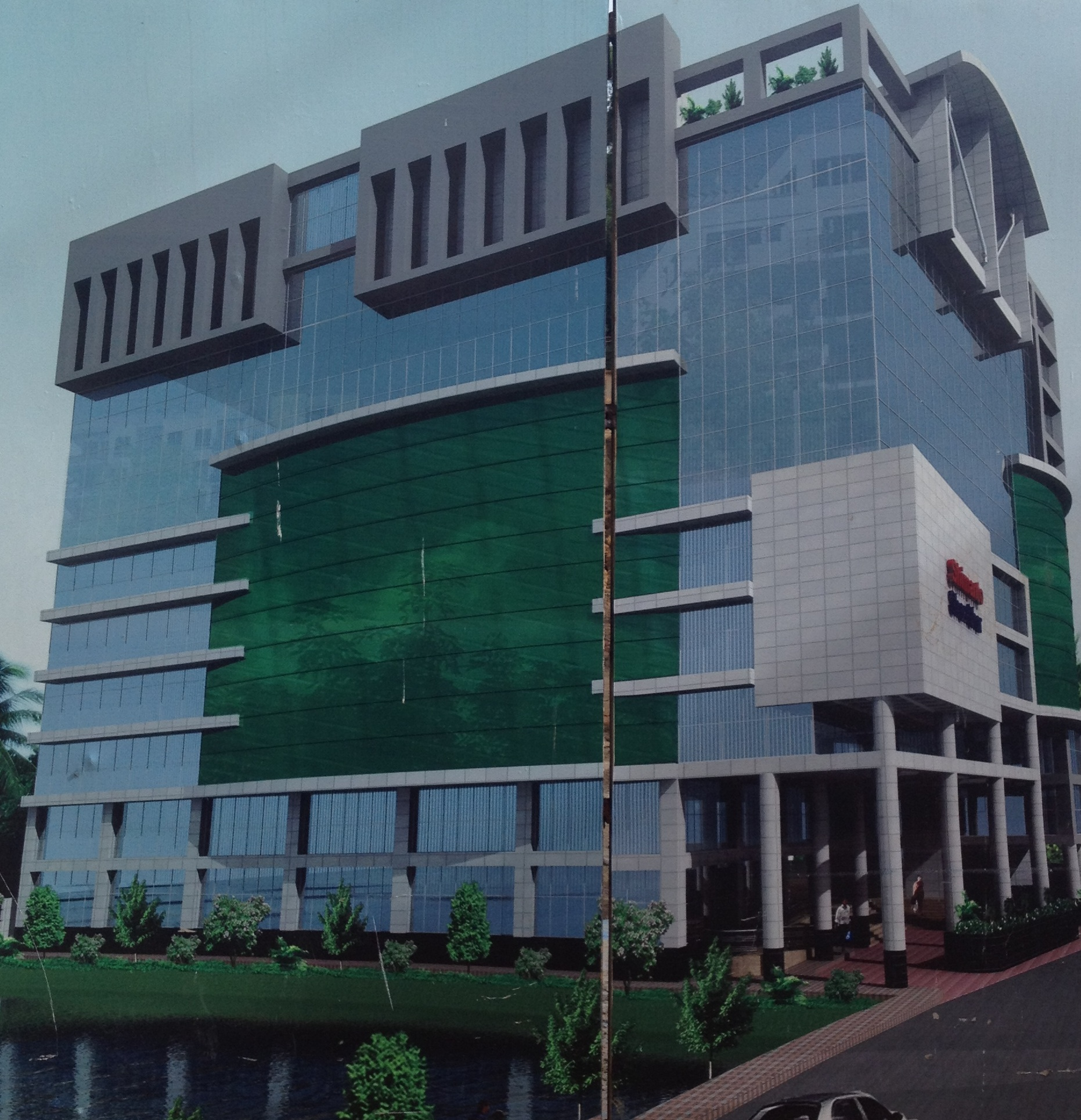
Shimanto Shombhar

== See also ==
- List of shopping malls in Bangladesh
