= Gulistan, Dhaka =

Commercial area in Dhaka

Coordinates: 23°43′30″N 90°24′38″E

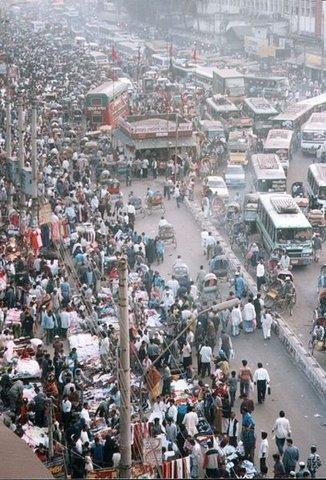
Dhaka crowd at Gulistan Crossing

Gulistan (Bengali: গুলিস্তান) is one of the busiest commercial areas in Dhaka, Bangladesh. A major transportation node, it originated around a now-demolished Pakistan-era cinema hall and is now a hub for commercial activity, particularly consumer goods. The area houses several important government establishments, including the Bangabandhu National Stadium. However, Gulistan suffers from issues such as overcrowding, traffic congestion, and criminal activity due to its dense population and commercial nature.

== Description ==
Gulistan is a major transportation node in the city, serving as a key transfer point for public transit routes and inter-district road connections. The area spans from the eastern side of Bangabandhu Avenue to the vicinity of Bangabhaban, the official presidential residence. Its northern boundary extends from the Nagar Bhaban to the Paltan intersection.

Gulistan's appearance has been drastically transformed over the years, with former green spaces replaced by dense construction of multi-story buildings along wide roads. It continues to attract heavy foot traffic and vehicular congestion from people across the city and country who converge there to earn their livelihoods or access services. One of the few remnants of its former state is the presence of some horse-drawn carriages amid the modern urban landscape. A major bus stand is situated in Gulistan, called the Gulistan (Fulbaria) Bus Station, built on the site of the former Fulbaria railway station. The 11-kilometre-long (6.8 mi) Gulistan–Jatrabari Flyover was opened in October 2013 to ease traffic jams and reduce travel time from the usual one hour to just five minutes.

== History ==
=== Origins ===
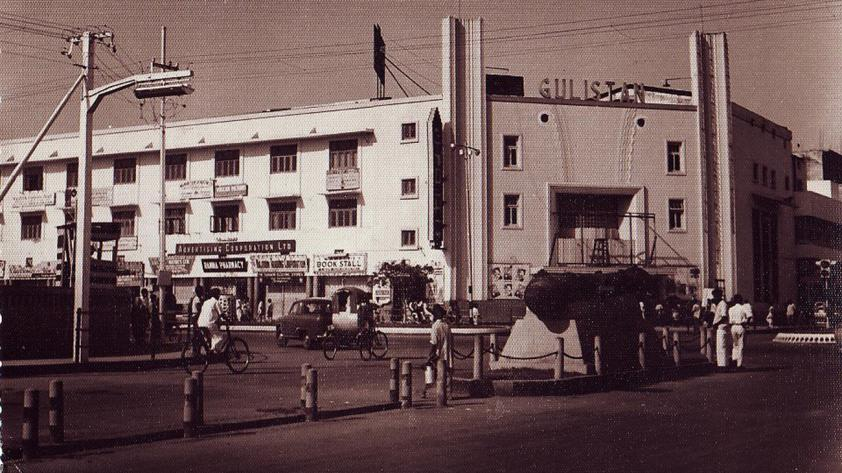
Gulistan Cinema Hall in 1963

Gulistan derives its name from a cinema hall named for the Persian word گلستان, golestan, 'flower garden', built by businessman, Fazal Khan Bahadur Dosani from Kolkata, inaugurated in 1953 by the Aga Khan III. The three-storey building, initially named Liberty, served as Dhaka's first modern air-conditioned theatre and became a prominent cultural and entertainment centre in the 1950s and 1960s, showcasing films from both East Pakistan and West Pakistan. Additionally, the area was renowned for a Mughal-era cannon. However, the cinema hall was demolished in 2005, and the cannon was some time relocated to Osmani Udyan.

Once considered the busiest commercial hub in Dhaka, the area experienced heavy vehicular and pedestrian traffic at all hours due to its concentration of shopping, entertainment, and dining establishments that drew visitors from across the city. Among the notable former businesses were Chow Chin Chow, reportedly Dhaka's first Chinese restaurant that introduced local residents to Chinese cuisine. Gulistan was also home to Baby Ice Cream, cited as the city's pioneer ice cream parlor. With its diverse array of retail stores, cinemas, and culinary offerings, Gulistan historically served as a popular destination for shopping, entertainment, and dining in central Dhaka before undergoing changes over the years.

=== Notable incidents ===
On 7 March 2023, at least 17 people were killed and hundreds injured in the 2023 Gulistan explosion near the BRTC bus counter. Experts pointed the cause of the explosion to a gas leak.

== Points of interest ==
Gulistan houses numerous significant institutions and sites of interest. It is home to the headquarters of the Dhaka South City Corporation (Nagar Bhaban), and the central offices of major entities like the Awami League political party. Notable landmarks include the National Book Centre, General Post Office (GPO), and the Bangabandhu National Stadium and Hockey Stadium sporting venues. The area also encompasses cultural attractions like the Mohanagar Natyamancha theater and the Golap Shah Mazar shrine.

In addition to institutional and religious sites, Gulistan is a thriving commercial hub containing major markets and shopping complexes. These include the Hall Market, Pir Yameeni Market, Khaddar Bazaar Shopping Complex and Gulistan Shopping Complex, as well as the Hotel Ramna. Gulistan houses the Gulistan Underground Market, a commercial area housed in a four-way underground pedestrian passage.

== Issues ==
Gulistan has gained notoriety for overcrowding, poor sanitation, drug abuse, pickpocketing, racketeering and other criminality such as extortion and begging. Despite repeated eviction drives by Dhaka South City Corporation, illegal street hawkers and vendors continue occupying roads and pavements, exacerbating traffic congestion and pedestrian difficulties, at times resulting in clashes and even gunfire.

== See also ==
- Paltan
