= List of movie theaters =

This is a list of movie theaters notable enough for Wikipedia articles. See also List of movie theater chains from across the world.

== Armenia ==
Name	Description	Country	Coordinates	Image
Moscow Cinema	Notable cinema in Yerevan, Armenia	Armenia		
Nairi Cinema	Oldest movie theatre in Yerevan, Armenia	Armenia		

== Bangladesh ==
Name	Description	Country	Coordinates	Image
Azad Cinema		Bangladesh		
Blockbuster Cinemas		Bangladesh		
CineScope	First mini theater in the country	Bangladesh		
Grand Riverview Cineplex		Bangladesh		
Grand Sylhet Movie Theater		Bangladesh		
K Screen Cineplex		Bangladesh		
Lion Cinemas		Bangladesh		
Modhubon Cinema		Bangladesh		
Modhumita Cinema		Bangladesh		
Momo Inn Cinema		Bangladesh		
Monihar Cinema		Bangladesh		
Shopnil Cinema		Bangladesh		
Shyamoli Cinema		Bangladesh		
Sugandha Cinema		Bangladesh		
Star Cineplex		Bangladesh		

== Canada ==
Name	Description	Country	Coordinates	Image
Cinémathèque québécoise		Canada	45.5139°N 73.5625°W	
Corona Theatre	Theatre in Montreal	Canada	45.483055555556°N 73.575277777778°W	
Eglinton Theatre		Canada	43.704444°N 79.410556°W	
Garneau Theatre		Canada	53.5231°N 113.512°W	
Rex Theatre		Canada	50.3298°N 102.26697°W	
Royal Cinema		Canada		

== Finland ==
Name	Description	Country	Coordinates	Image
Imatra		Finland		
Tennispalatsi	Building in Helsinki, Finland	Finland	60.169722222222°N 24.930277777778°E	

== France ==
Name	Description	Country	Coordinates	Image
Cinéma du Panthéon		France	48.84751111°N 2.34228333°E	
L'Arlequin		France	48.8511107°N 2.3305178°E	
L'Idéal Cinéma démolished on 1995	Movie theater	France	50.33055556°N 3.25194444°E	
La Géode	Geodesic dome in Paris	France	48.89444444°N 2.38861111°E	
Le Balzac	Movie theater in Paris	France	48.8726°N 2.29958°E	
Le Champo		France	48.85003611°N 2.34313611°E	
Le Grand Rex	Cinema in Paris, France	France	48.870502777778°N 2.347725°E	
Max Linder Panorama		France	48.87136944°N 2.34486667°E	
The Studio des Ursulines	Cinema in Paris	France	48.8427°N 2.3419°E	

== Germany ==
Name	Description	Country	Coordinates	Image
Babylon	Movie theater in Berlin, Germany	Germany	52.5258°N 13.4119°E	
Kino International		Germany	52.5203°N 13.4228°E	
Zoo Palast	Movie theater in the Bikini-Berlin complex in Berlin, Germany	Germany		

== Italy ==
Name	Description	Country	Coordinates	Image
Teatro Adriano		Italy	41.905894°N 12.469771°E	
Teatro Dante	Theatre and cinema in Sansepolcro (Italy)	Italy	43.569538888889°N 12.144119444444°E	

== Netherlands ==
Name	Description	Country	Coordinates	Image
EYE Film Institute Netherlands	Dutch archive and museum for cinema	Netherlands	52.384411°N 4.900594°E	
Melkweg		Netherlands	52.364778°N 4.881336°E	
PandaVision		Netherlands	51.648719°N 5.046635°E	
Rialto		Netherlands	52.353056°N 4.893889°E	
Royal Theater Heerlen		Netherlands	50.88972°N 5.975°E; 50.88992°N 5.97532°E	
Toneelschuur		Netherlands	52.381666666667°N 4.6391666666667°E	
Tuschinski		Netherlands	52.366111°N 4.894444°E	

== Poland ==
Name	Description	Country	Coordinates	Image
Atlantic	Notable cinema in Warsaw, Poland	Poland		
Kino Iluzjon		Poland		
Kino Mikro		Poland		

== Sweden ==
Name	Description	Country	Coordinates	Image
Astoria		Sweden	59.33472222°N 18.0775°E	
Bergakungen		Sweden	57.70222222°N 11.98638889°E	
Cosmonova	IMAX fulldome video theatre in Stockholm, Sweden	Sweden	59.368666666667°N 18.054444444444°E	
Draken		Sweden	59.33166667°N 18.02694444°E	
Göta Lejon		Sweden	59.313692°N 18.073368°E	
Maximteatern		Sweden	59.336944444444°N 18.088888888889°E	

== Turkey ==
Name	Description	Country	Coordinates	Image
Atlas		Turkey	41.03419°N 28.97920°E	
Emek		Turkey	41.03491°N 28.979697°E	

== United Kingdom ==
Name	Description	Country	Coordinates	Image
Broadway Cinema		United Kingdom	52.9543°N 1.14383°W	
Castle Cinema		United Kingdom	51.6208°N 3.94139°W	
Curzon Mayfair Cinema	Cinema in London	United Kingdom	51.506537°N 0.148049°W	
Dominion Cinema	Independent cinema in Edinburgh	United Kingdom	55.9308°N 3.20861°W	
Electric Palace Cinema, Harwich		United Kingdom	51.9465°N 1.2888°E	
Granada Cinema	Former Granada movie theatre in Woolwich, South East London.	United Kingdom		
Lewisham Odeon		United Kingdom		
London IMAX	IMAX cinema in the South Bank district of London, just north of Waterloo Station	United Kingdom	51.505°N 0.11361111111111°W	
Odeon Cinema, Manchester	Cinema on Oxford Street, Manchester, England	United Kingdom		
Odeon Leicester Square	Cinema which occupies the centre of the eastern side of Leicester Square, London	United Kingdom	51.5106°N 0.129167°W	
Odeon, Kingstanding	Former cinema in north Birmingham, England	United Kingdom	52.5536°N 1.885°W	
Phoenix Cinema	Cinema in East Finchley, London	United Kingdom	51.588504°N 0.163706°W	
Safari Cinema	Cinema in Croydon, United Kingdom	United Kingdom	51.3825°N 0.1075°W	
Savoy Theatre	Theatre in Monmouth, Wales	United Kingdom	51.8129°N 2.71452°W	
Ultimate Picture Palace	Cinema in east Oxford, England	United Kingdom	51.7488°N 1.23935°W	

== United States ==
Name	Description	Country	Coordinates	Image
Artcraft Theatre	Indiana (Franklin)	United States of America	39.4812°N 86.055°W	
Astor Theater	Pennsylvania (Reading)	United States of America		
Bleecker Street Cinema	New York (Manhattan)	United States of America	40.72799°N 73.99943°W	
Booth Theater	Kansas (Independence)	United States of America	37.225278°N 95.706111°W	
Cable Car Cinema	Rhode Island (Providence)	United States of America	41.8231469144045°N 71.40539259814672°W	
Capitol Theater	Iowa (Burlington)	United States of America	40.8094°N 91.1031°W	
Capitol Theatre Building	Michigan (Flint)	United States of America		
Castro Theatre	California (San Francisco)	United States of America	37.762°N 122.435°W	
Cine Capri	Arizona (Phoenix)	United States of America		
Cinema 21	Oregon (Portland)	United States of America		
Cleveland Cinematheque	Ohio (Cleveland)	United States of America	41.509°N 81.6096°W	
Cliff Theater	Colorado (Wray)	United States of America	40.0775°N 102.22194444°W	
Colonial Theatre	Virginia (South Hill)	United States of America	36.7247°N 78.1308°W	
Congress Theater	Illinois (Chicago)	United States of America	41.92°N 87.6922°W	
Donk's Theatre	Virginia (Hudgins)	United States of America	37.4714°N 76.3264°W	
Florida Theatre	Florida (Jacksonville)	United States of America	30.326111°N 81.655556°W	
Fox Theatre	Georgia (Atlanta)	United States of America	33.7725°N 84.385556°W	
Fox Theatre Inglewood	California (Inglewood)	United States of America	33.963287°N 118.352427°W	
Gothic Theatre	Colorado (Englewood)	United States of America	39.6576°N 104.988°W	
Leader Theater	Pennsylvania (Philadelphia)	United States of America	39.9652°N 75.2056°W	
Los Angeles Theatre	California (Los Angeles)	United States of America	34.046389°N 118.2525°W	
Masonic Temple Theater	Iowa (Mount Pleasant)	United States of America	40.9672°N 91.5531°W	
Menominee Opera House	Michigan (Menominee)	United States of America	45.1033°N 87.6028°W	
Newton Theater	Washington, D.C.	United States of America	38.935556°N 76.990833°W	
Northrup Theater	Kansas (Syracuse)	United States of America	37.9842°N 101.752°W	
Oriental Theatre	Wisconsin (Milwaukee)	United States of America	43.0597°N 87.8857°W	
Palace Theater	Tennessee (Crossville)	United States of America	35.946944°N 85.025833°W	
Paramount Theatre	California (Oakland)	United States of America	37.81°N 122.268°W	
Phoenix Theater	California (Petaluma)	United States of America	38.235°N 122.643°W	
Pitts Theatre	Virginia (Culpeper)	United States of America	38.4733°N 77.9964°W	
Royal Theater	Florida (St. Petersburg)	United States of America	27.7597°N 82.6631°W	
Royal Theatre	Arkansas (Benton)	United States of America	34.563055555556°N 92.588333333333°W	
Senator Theatre	Maryland (Baltimore)	United States of America	39.3636°N 76.6108°W	
Somerville Theatre	Massachusetts (Somerville)	United States of America	42.39676286°N 71.12287903°W	
St. Johns Twin Cinema	Oregon (Portland)	United States of America	45.5906°N 122.756°W	
Sundance Kabuki	California (San Francisco)	United States of America	37.785°N 122.433°W	
The 3-Penny Cinema	Illinois (Chicago)	United States of America		
Tower Theater	California (Los Angeles)	United States of America	34.043375°N 118.254444°W	
Uptown Theater	Wisconsin (Racine)	United States of America	42.715833333333°N 87.798333333333°W	
Virginia Theatre	Illinois (Champaign)	United States of America	40.117°N 88.2455°W	
Vista Theatre	California (Los Angeles)	United States of America	34.0984°N 118.287°W	
Warner Theatre	West Virginia (Morgantown)	United States of America		
Williamsburg Cinemas	New York (Brooklyn)	United States of America	40.714143888889°N 73.959858888889°W	
New Beverly Cinema	California (Los Angeles)	United States of America	34.076228°N 118.345758°W	
Ziegfeld Theatre	New York (Manhattan)	United States of America	40.762694444444°N 73.978805555556°W; 40.762777777778°N 73.979722222222°W	

== Misc ==
Name	Description	Country	Coordinates	Image
Amoudah Cinema fire		Syria		
Coliseum		Spain	41.3881°N 2.16611°E	
Colosseum Kino		Norway	59.92963°N 10.710651°E	
DHA Cinema		Pakistan		
Faenza theatre	Movie theatre in Bogotá, Colombia	Colombia	4.5975°N 74.0718°W	
Grand Theatre	Movie Theater in Copenhagen district Indre By	Denmark	55.6765°N 12.5709°E	
Kings Cross Theatre	Popular Sydney movie theatre 1916–1966.	Australia	33.875352°S 151.222067°E	
Rivoli Cinema		Australia		
Rossiya Theatre		Russia	55.766111111111°N 37.6075°E	
The Flicks Community Movie Houses		Cambodia		

== See also ==
- Movie theater
