= Cable car =

Cable car most commonly refers to the following cable transportation systems:

- Aerial lift, such as aerial tramways and gondola lifts, in which the vehicle is suspended in the air from a cable
  - Aerial tramway
  - Chairlift
  - Gondola lift
    - Bicable gondola lift
    - Tricable gondola lift
- Cable railway, in which the vehicle rests on rails or a road
  - Cable car (railway), a type of cable transportation used for mass transit
  - Funicular, a type of cable transportation on a slope, which is referred to in Japan as "cable car" (ケーブルカー, kēburukā)

Cable car may also refer to:

- Cable Car (cocktail), a modern variant on the sidecar
- Cable Car Cinema, a former movie theater and restaurant in Providence, Rhode Island

Songs

- "Over My Head (Cable Car)", a 2005 song by The Fray on the album How to Save a Life
- "Cable Car", a 1971 song by The Hollies on the album Distant Light
- "Cable Car", a 2021 song by Abhi the Nomad on the album Abhi vs the Universe

== See also ==
- Cable ferry
- Reaction ferry
- Ski lift
- Skyline logging
- Surface lift
- Transporter bridge
- Zip-line
