= Cable grip =

Device propelling a vehicle through a wire rope

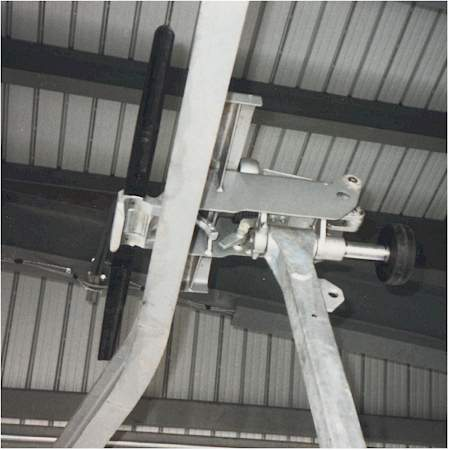
Detachable chairlift grip. (Chair is on a sidetrack).

A cable grip is a device for propelling a vehicle by attaching to a wire rope (called a haul rope) running at a (relatively) constant speed. The vehicle may be suspended from the cable, as in the case of aerial lifts such as a gondola lift (télécabine), may be guided by rails, as in a cable traction railway, or may be self-guiding, as in a button lift. Typically, multiple vehicles will use the same cable; where just one or two vehicles are in use they will tend to be attached to the cable permanently such as in funiculars.

While the cable grips used in the original cable railways were manually operated, requiring considerable skill and strength, modern cable grips tend to be automatic. Given that the cable runs at a relatively constant speed, accelerating the vehicle to match the speed of the cable presents a technical difficulty; possible methods are to apply the grip gradually, to accelerate the vehicle (e.g. by guiding wheels) prior to applying the grip, or to use a sprung linkage between the grip and the vehicle. The cable must also be able to handle friction from the grip and increased load while the vehicle is accelerating.

Cable grips have additional uses, such as supporting electric or structural cables for pulling or laying of the electric or structural cable itself. In such use they may also be called cable pulling grips, cable socks, or cable stockings.

== The Eppelsheimer bottom grip ==
This is the type of grip used in the cable cars of San Francisco. The grip is attached to the lead truck of the car (or both trucks, in the case of double-ended cars), and is a field-replaceable unit. While side grips and even top grips have been used, the sheer number of rope (cable) changes, crossings, and "let-go" curves make the bottom grip, i.e., one in which the jaws open directly downward, the most practical type.

The operating lever raises and lowers the center plate of the grip, which in turn operates the jaws. With the lever fully forward, the grip is open, and the cable is free to fall out, which is necessary when the cable crosses under another line, reaches the end of a line, or negotiates a "let-go" curve. With the cable lifted into the jaws, the operating lever is pulled back, forcing the jaws between two fixed rollers, and capturing the cable between the grip's replaceable mild-steel dies, but without applying pressure. To start moving the car, the operating lever is pulled back further, squeezing the cable between the dies.

The grip was designed by the German railway mechanical engineer William Eppelsheimer in around 1880.

See also Andrew Smith Hallidie.

== Vehicles using cable grips ==
=== Suspended ===
- Gondola lift (télécabine)
- Detachable chairlift

=== On rails ===
- Cable traction railway
- People mover

=== Self-guiding ===
- Button lift
