= Cable car (railway) =

Cable-hauled mass transit system

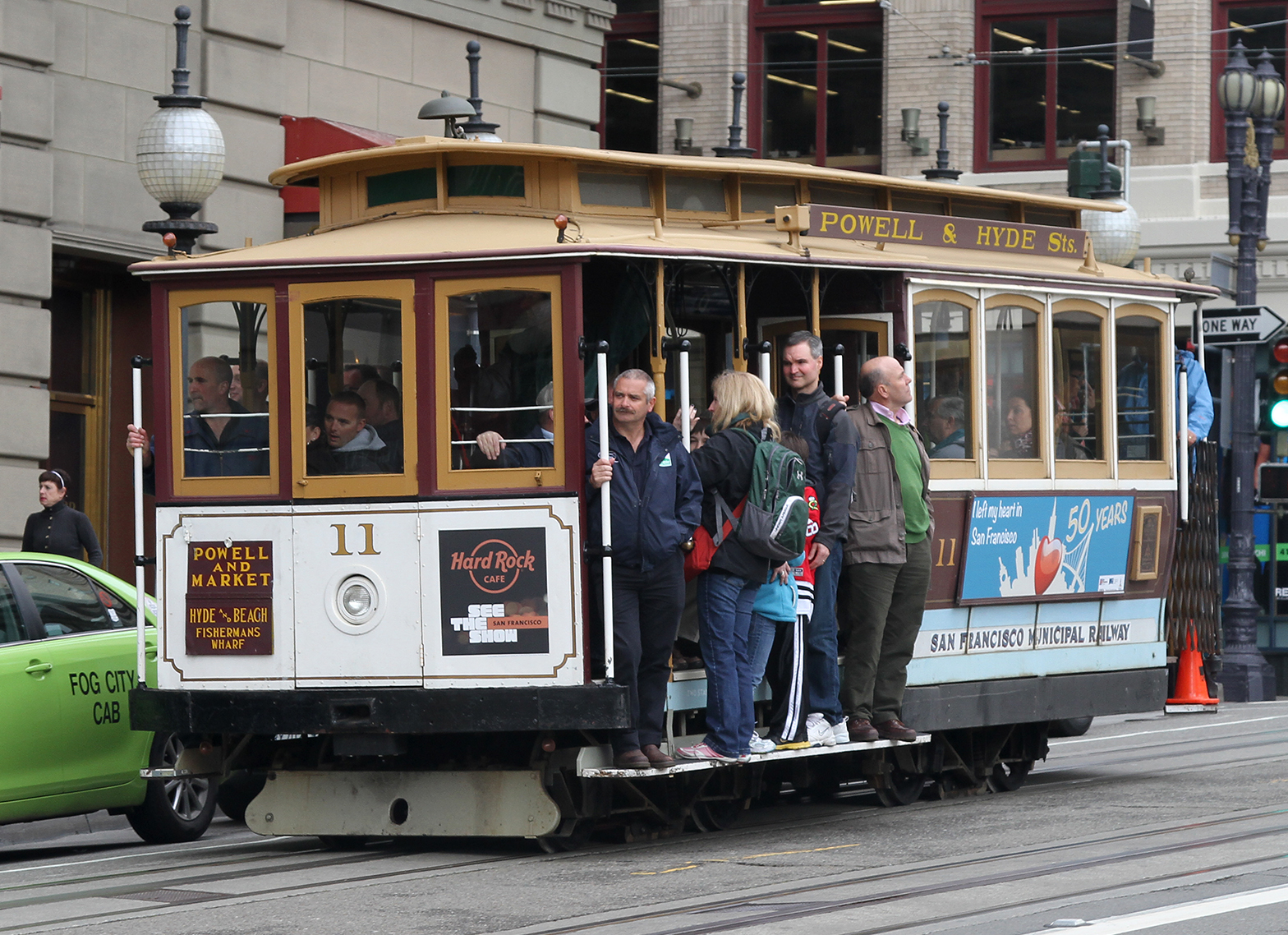
A San Francisco cable car on the Powell & Hyde line

A cable car (usually known as a cable tram outside North America) is a type of cable railway used for mass transit in which rail cars are hauled by a continuously moving cable running at a constant speed. Individual cars stop and start by releasing and gripping this cable as required. Cable cars are distinct from funiculars, where the cars are permanently attached to the cable.

View from a cable car in San Francisco

== History ==
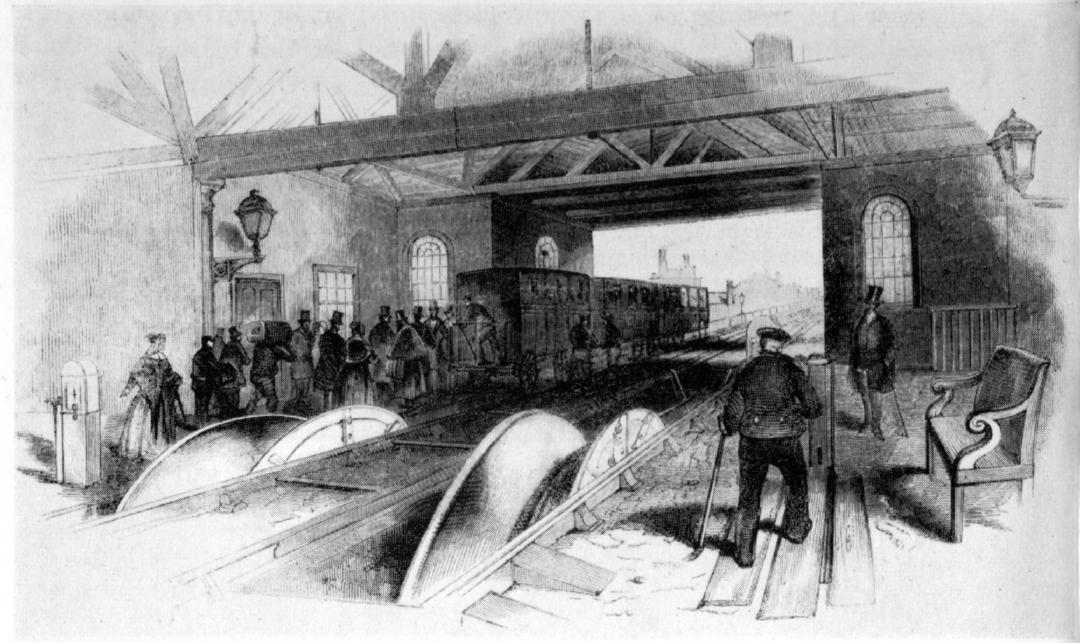
Winding drums on the London and Blackwall cable-operated railway, 1840

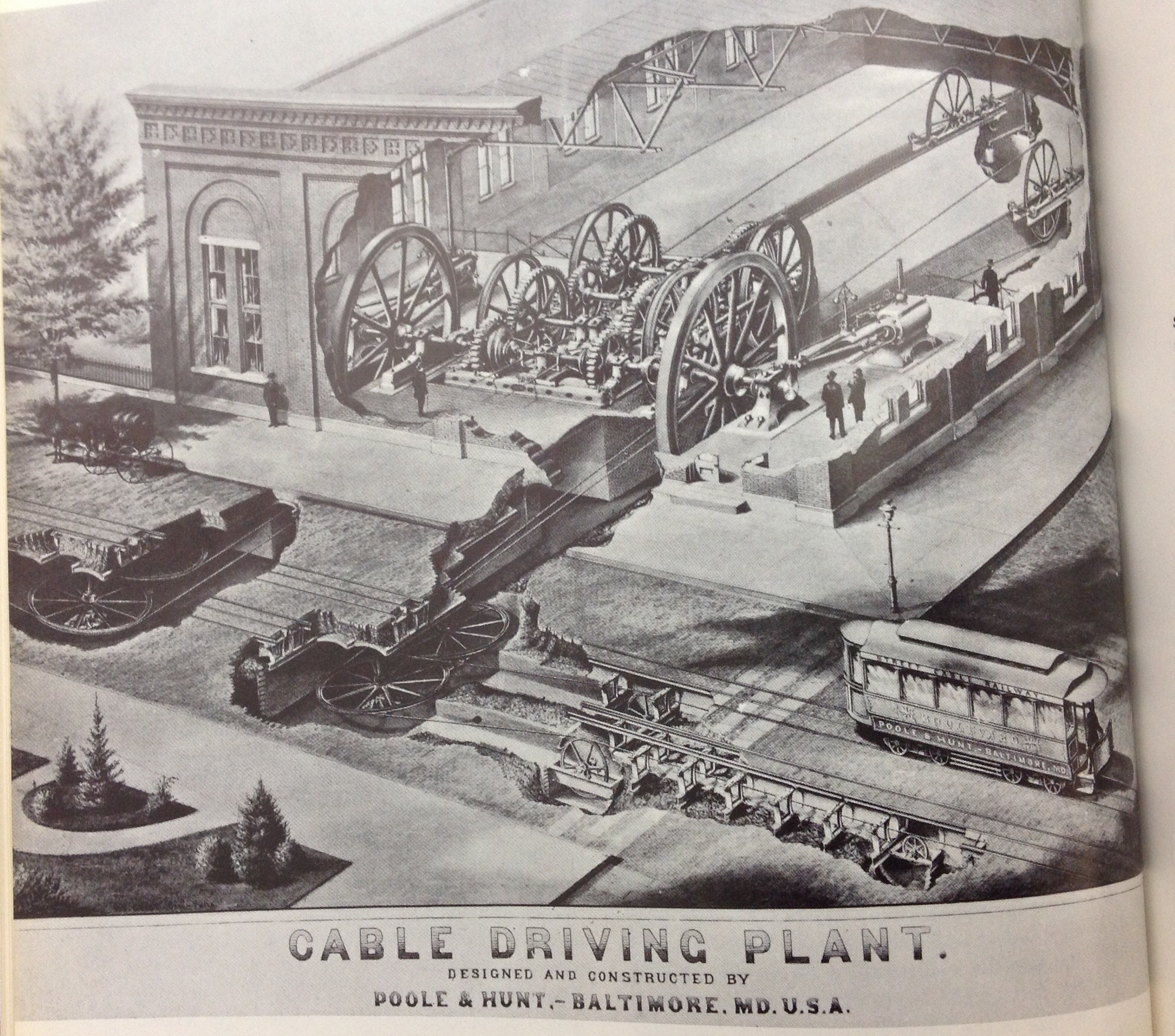
Cable Driving Plant, Designed and Constructed by Poole & Hunt, Baltimore, MD. Drawing by P.F. Goist, circa 1882. The powerhouse has two horizontal single-cylinder engines. The lithograph shows a hypothetical prototype of a cable powerhouse, rather than any actual built structure. Poole & Hunt, machinists and engineers, was a major cable industry designer and contractor and manufacturer of gearing, sheaves, shafting and wire rope drums. They did work for cable railways in Baltimore, Chicago, Hoboken, Kansas City, New York, and Philadelphia.

The first cable-operated railway to use a moving rope that could be picked up or released by a grip on the cars was the Fawdon Wagonway, a colliery railway line that opened in 1826.

Another began operation in 1840: the London and Blackwall Railway, which hauled passengers in east London, England. The rope available at the time proved too susceptible to wear and the system was abandoned in favour of steam locomotives after eight years.

In America, the first cable car installation in operation probably was the West Side and Yonkers Patent Railway, New York City's first-ever elevated railway, which ran from 1 July 1868 to 1870. The collar-equipped cables and claw-equipped cars proving cumbersome, and the line was closed and rebuilt to operate with steam locomotives.

In 1869, P. G. T. Beauregard demonstrated a cable car at New Orleans and was issued U.S. patent 97,343.

In 1873, the Clay Street Hill Railroad, which later became part of the San Francisco cable car system, was first tested. Promoted by Andrew Smith Hallidie with design work by William Eppelsheimer, the line's grips became the model for other cable car transit systems, whose cars were often known as the Hallidie Cable Car.

In 1881, the first such system opened outside San Francisco: the Dunedin cable tramway system in Dunedin, New Zealand. For Dunedin, George Smith Duncan further developed the Hallidie model, introducing the pull curve and the slot brake; the former was a way to pull cars through a curve, since Dunedin's curves were too sharp to allow coasting, while the latter forced a wedge down into the cable slot to stop the car. Both of these innovations were generally adopted by other cities, including San Francisco.

In Australia: the Melbourne cable tramway system operated from 1885 to 1940 and was one of the most extensive in the world with 1200 trams and trailers operating over 15 routes with 103 kilometres (64 mi) of track; Sydney had two cable tram routes, Milsons Point to North Sydney (1886-1905) and King Street Wharf to Edgecliff (1894-1905).

Cable cars rapidly spread to other cities, although the major attraction for most was the ability to displace horsecar (or mule-drawn) systems rather than the ability to climb hills. Many people at the time viewed horse-drawn transit as unnecessarily cruel, and the fact that a typical horse could work only four or five hours per day necessitated the maintenance of large stables of draft animals that had to be fed, housed, groomed, medicated and rested. Thus, for a period, economics worked in favour of cable cars even in relatively flat cities.

For example, the Chicago City Railway, also designed by Eppelsheimer, opened in Chicago in 1882 and went on to become the largest and most profitable cable car system. As with many cities, the problem in flat Chicago was not one of incline, but of transportation capacity. This caused a different approach to the combination of grip car and trailer. Rather than using a grip car and single trailer, as many cities did, or combining the grip and trailer into a single car, like San Francisco's California Cars, Chicago used grip cars to pull trains of up to three trailers.

In 1883 the New York and Brooklyn Bridge Railway was opened, which had a most curious feature: though it was a cable car system, it used steam locomotives to get the cars into and out of the terminals. After 1896 the system was changed to one on which a motor car was added to each train to maneuver at the terminals, while en route, the trains were still propelled by the cable.

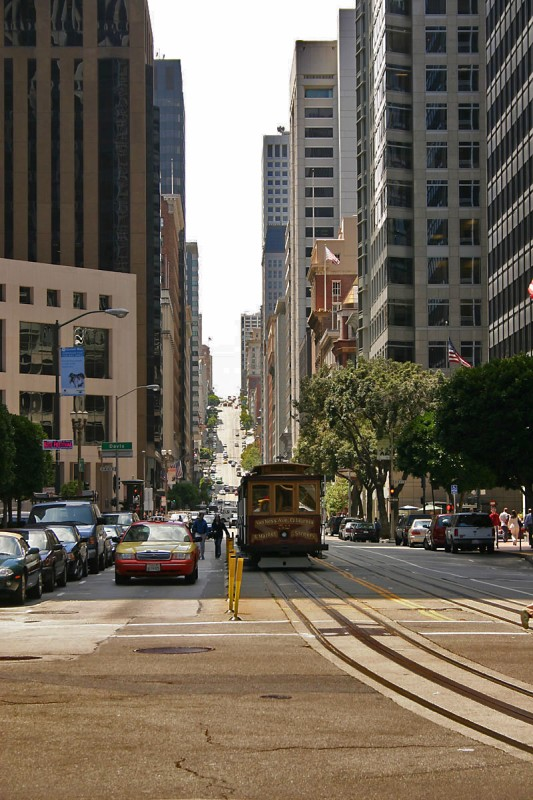
A San Francisco cable car travels along California Street in the city's Financial District.

On 25 September 1883, a test of a cable car system was held by Liverpool Tramways Company in Kirkdale, Liverpool. This would have been the first cable car system in Europe, but the company decided against implementing it. Instead, the distinction went to the 1884 Highgate Hill Cable Tramway, a route from Archway to Highgate, north London, which used a continuous cable and grip system on the 1 in 11 (9%) climb of Highgate Hill. The installation was not reliable and was replaced by electric traction in 1909. Other cable car systems were implemented in Europe, though, among which was the Glasgow District Subway, the first underground cable car system, in 1896. (London, England's first deep-level tube railway, the City & South London Railway, had earlier also been built for cable haulage but had been converted to electric traction before opening in 1890.) A few more cable car systems were built in the United Kingdom, Portugal, and France. European cities, having many more curves in their streets, were ultimately less suitable for cable cars than American cities.

Though some new cable car systems were still being built, by 1890 the cheaper to construct and simpler to operate electrically-powered trolley or tram started to become the norm, and eventually started to replace existing cable car systems. For a while hybrid cable/electric systems operated, for example in Chicago where electric cars had to be pulled by grip cars through the loop area, due to the lack of trolley wires there. Eventually, San Francisco became the only street-running manually operated system to survive – Dunedin, the second city with such cars, was also the second-last city to operate them, closing down in 1957.

=== Recent revival ===
In the last decades of the 20th century and the early 21st century, cable traction in general has seen a limited revival as automatic people movers, used in resort areas, airports (for example, Terminal Link at Toronto Pearson International Airport opening in 2006 and Oakland Airport Connector at Oakland International Airport, San Francisco), huge hospital centers and some urban settings. While many of these systems involve cars permanently attached to the cable, the Minimetro system from Poma/Leitner Group and the Cable Liner system from DCC Doppelmayr Cable Car both have variants that allow the cars to be automatically decoupled from the cable under computer control, and can thus be considered a modern interpretation of the cable car.

== Operation ==
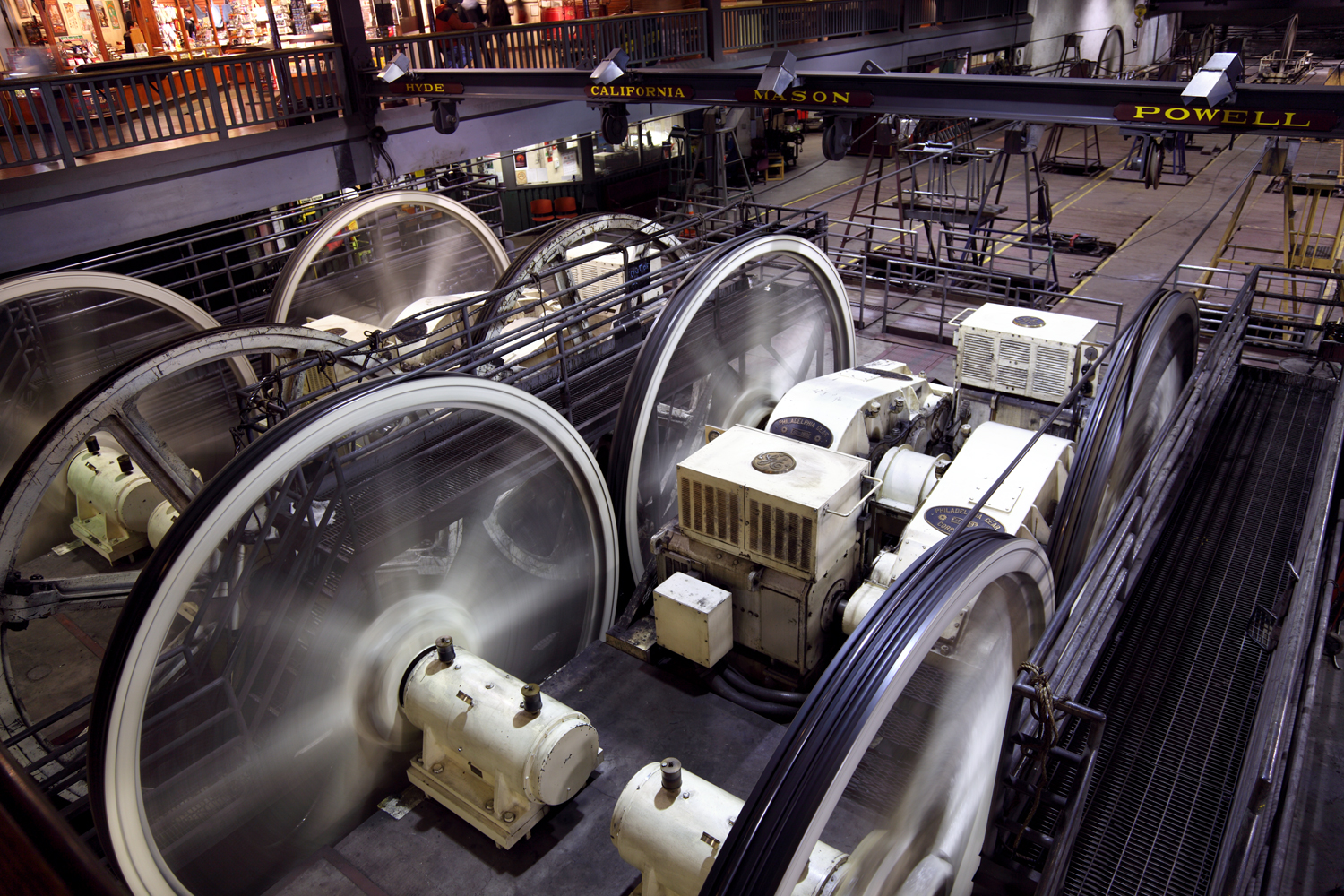
Machinery driving the San Francisco cable car system in the Cable Car Museum

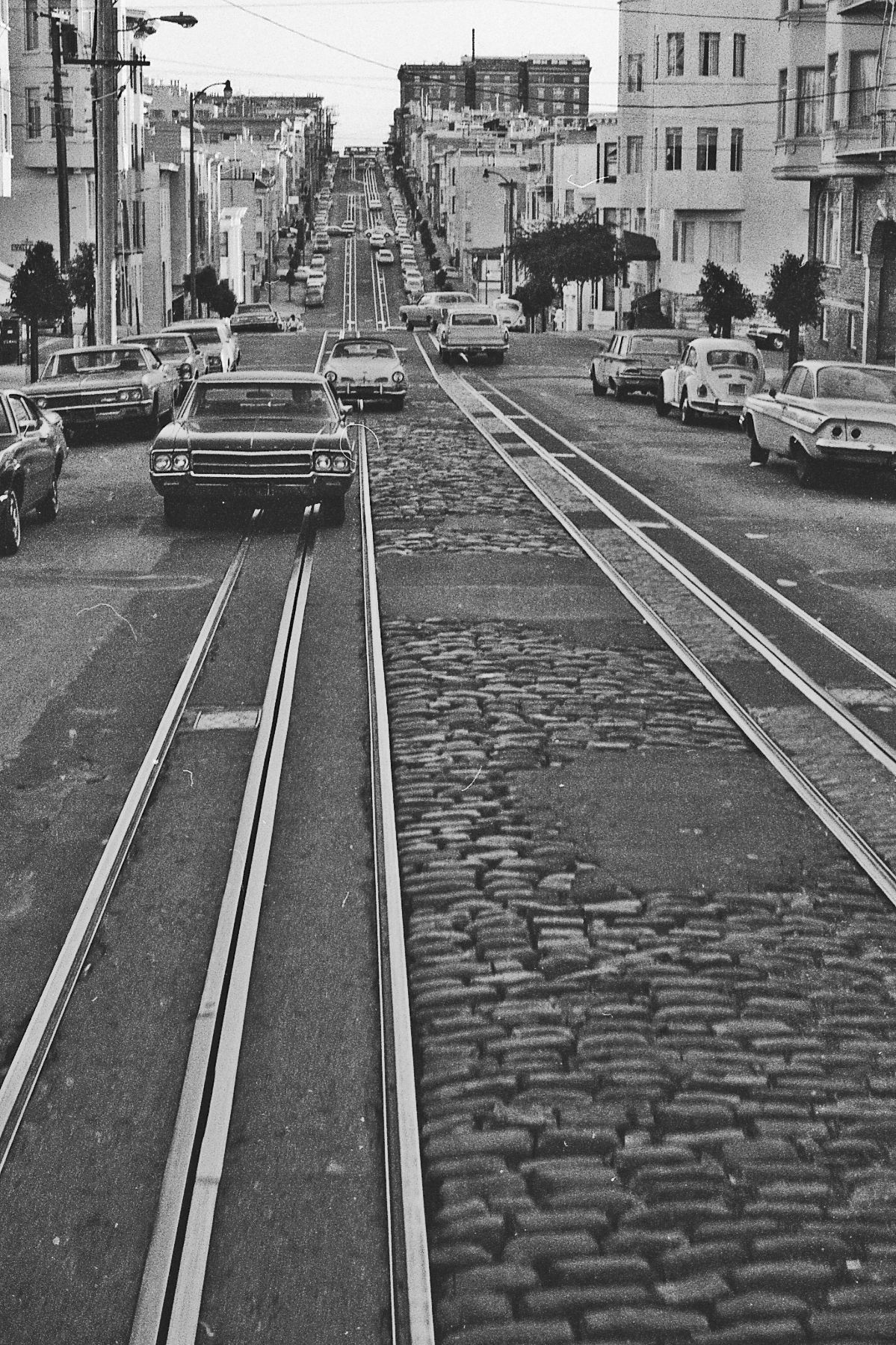
The cable slot lies centered between the two rails of the track, providing an ingress for the grip, 1970.

The cable is itself powered by a stationary engine or motor situated in a cable house or power house. The speed at which it moves is relatively constant depending on the number of units gripping the cable at any given time.

The cable car begins moving when a clamping device attached to the car, called a grip, applies pressure to ("grip") the moving cable. Conversely, the car is stopped by releasing pressure on the cable (with or without completely detaching) and applying the brakes. This gripping and releasing action may be manual, as was the case in all early cable car systems, or automatic, as is the case in some recent cable operated people mover type systems. Gripping must be applied evenly and gradually in order to avoid bringing the car to cable speed too quickly and unacceptably jarring passengers.

The grip of manual systems resembles a large pair of pliers, and considerable strength and skill are required to operate the car. As many early cable car operators discovered, an improperly applied grip can damage the cable. A grip can also become entangled in the cable; when this happens, the cable car may not be able to stop and can wreak havoc along its route until the cable house realizes the mishap and halts the cable.

One apparent advantage of the cable car is its relative energy efficiency. This is due to the economy of centrally located power stations, and the ability of descending cars to transfer energy to ascending cars. However, this advantage is totally negated by the relatively large energy consumption required to simply move the cable over and under the numerous guide rollers and around the many sheaves. Approximately 95% of the tractive effort in the San Francisco system is expended in simply moving the four cables at 15.3 km/h (9.5 mph). Electric cars with regenerative braking do offer the advantages, without the problem of moving a cable. In the case of steep grades, however, cable traction has the major advantage of not depending on adhesion between wheels and rails. There is also the advantage that keeping the car gripped to the cable will also limit the downhill speed of the car to that of the cable and provide counterbalance to uphill cars.

Because of the constant and relatively low speed, a cable car's potential to cause harm in an accident can be underestimated. Even with a cable car traveling at only 14 km/h (9 mph), the mass of the cable car and the combined strength and speed of the cable can cause extensive damage in a collision.

== Relation to funiculars ==
A cable car is superficially similar to a funicular, but differs from such a system in that its cars are not permanently attached to the cable and can stop independently, whereas a funicular has cars that are permanently attached to the propulsion cable, which is itself stopped and started. A cable car cannot climb as steep a grade as a funicular, but many more cars can be operated with a single cable, making it more flexible, and allowing a higher capacity. During the rush hour on San Francisco's Market Street Railway in 1883, a car would leave the terminal every 15 seconds.

A few funicular railways operate in street traffic, and because of this operation are often incorrectly described as cable cars. Examples of such operation, and the consequent confusion, are:

- The Great Orme Tramway in Llandudno, Wales.
- Several street funiculars in Lisbon, Portugal.

Even more confusingly, a hybrid cable car/funicular line once existed in the form of the original Wellington Cable Car, in the New Zealand city of Wellington. This line had both a continuous loop haulage cable that the cars gripped using a cable car gripper, and a balance cable permanently attached to both cars over an undriven pulley at the top of the line. The descending car gripped the haulage cable and was pulled downhill, in turn pulling the ascending car (which remained ungripped) uphill by the balance cable. This line was rebuilt in 1979 and is now a standard funicular, although it retains its old cable car name.

== List of cable car systems ==
=== Cities currently operating cable cars ===
==== Traditional cable car systems ====
The only existing traditional cable car system is the San Francisco cable car system in the city of San Francisco, California. San Francisco's cable cars constitute the oldest and largest such system in permanent operation, and it is one of the few still functioning in the traditional manner, with manually operated cars running in street traffic. Other examples of cable powered street running systems can be found on the Great Orme in North Wales, and in Lisbon in Portugal. Both of these, however, are funiculars.

==== Modern cable car systems ====
Several cities operate a modern version of the cable car system. These systems are fully automated and run on their own reserved right of way. They are commonly referred to as people movers, although that term is also applied to systems with other forms of propulsion, including funicular style cable propulsion.

These cities include:

- Oakland, California, United States – The Oakland Airport Connector system between the BART rapid transit system and Oakland International Airport, based on Doppelmayr Cable Car's Cable Liner Pinched Loop
- Perugia, Italy – The Perugia People Mover, based on Leitner's MiniMetro
- Shanghai, China - The Bund Sightseeing Tunnel, based on Soulé's SK
- Caracas, Venezuela - The Cabletren Bolivariano, based on Doppelmayr Cable Car's Cable Liner Pinched Loop
- Zürich, Switzerland - The Skymetro connects the Zurich Airport's main Airside Center, Gates A, B and C with its mid-field Gates E, based on OTIS's Otis Hovair

=== Cities previously operating cable cars ===
==== Australia ====
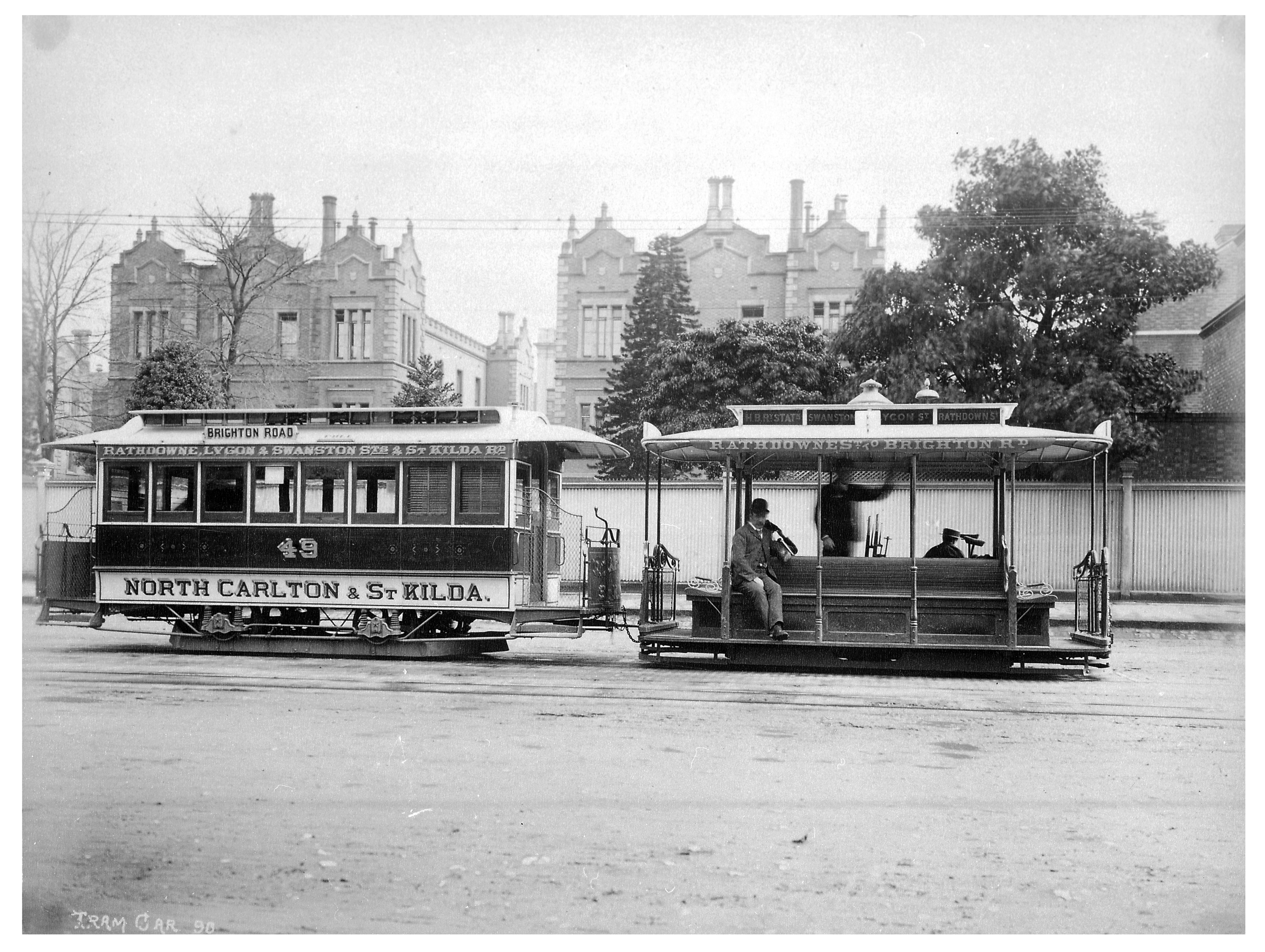
Cable tram and trailer on the St Kilda Line in Melbourne in 1905

- Melbourne (1885–1940). Main article: Melbourne cable tramway system
- Sydney (1886–1905). Milsons Point to North Sydney (1886-1905) and King Street Wharf to Edgecliff (1894-1905).

==== France ====
- Laon – The Poma 2000 (service ended in 2016)
- Paris (Tramway funiculaire de Belleville 1873–1935)

==== Lebanon ====
- Beirut (Late 1880s until destruction during the Lebanese Civil War)

==== New Zealand ====
- Dunedin (1881–1957, the Dunedin cable tramway system)
- Wellington (1902–1979, the original Wellington Cable Car hybrid system)

==== Philippines ====
- Manila (Early 1900s-1930s, the Manila-Malabon railway.)

==== Portugal ====
- Lisbon (converted to regular tram lines in the early 20th century: São Sebastião, Estrela, and Graça)

==== United Kingdom ====
- Birmingham (City of Birmingham Tramways Company Ltd, 1888–1911, converted to electric traction)
- Edinburgh (Edinburgh Corporation Tramways, 1899–1923, converted to electric traction)
- Glasgow (Glasgow Subway, 1896–1935, converted to electric traction)
- Hastings
- Liverpool (trial in 1883)
- London, England (1884–1909, Highgate Hill Cable Tramway connecting Archway with Highgate, the first cable car in regular operation in Europe)
- Matlock (1893–1927, the Matlock Cable Tramway)

==== Isle of Man ====
- Douglas (1896–1929, the Upper Douglas Cable Tramway)

==== United States ====
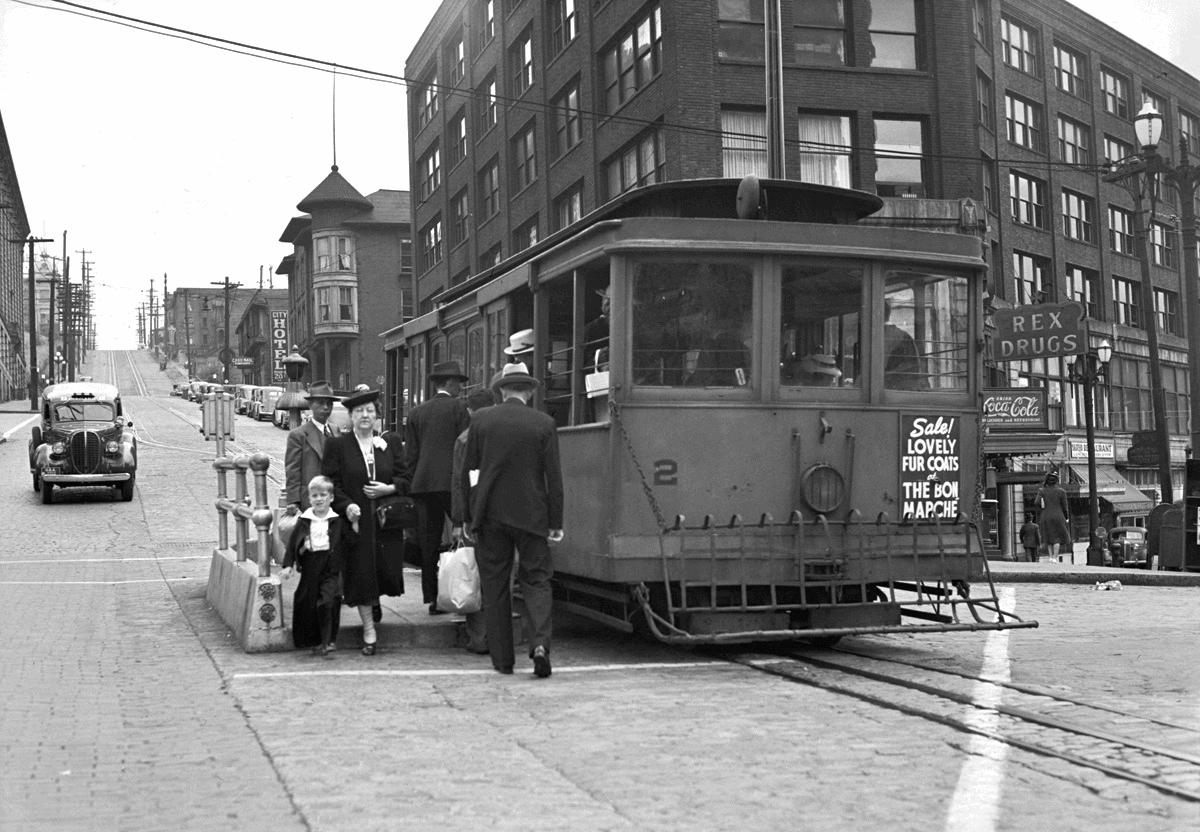
A Seattle cable car in 1940, just before service ended. Seattle was the last city in the U.S. to abandon all its street cable railways, with the last three lines all closing in 1940, leaving San Francisco as the only U.S. city where cable cars continued to operate.

- Baltimore, Maryland (1890–1897)
- Binghamton, New York (Washington Street and State Asylum Railroad 1885–1888)
- Brooklyn, New York
  - New York and Brooklyn Bridge Railway
  - Brooklyn Cable Company's Park Avenue Line
  - Brooklyn Heights Railroad's Montague Street Line
- Butte, Montana (1889–1897)
- Chicago, Illinois (1882–1906)
  - Chicago City Railway
  - North Chicago Street Railroad
  - West Chicago Street Railroad
- Cincinnati, Ohio
- Cleveland, Ohio
- Denver, Colorado (1886–1900, the Denver Tramway)
- Grand Rapids, Michigan
- Hoboken, New Jersey (1886–1892, the North Hudson County Railway's Hoboken Elevated)
- Kansas City, Missouri (1885–1913), including 9th St Incline (1888–1902), 8th St. Tunnel in use (1887–1956)
- Los Angeles, California
  - Second Street Cable Railway (1885–1889)
  - Temple Street Cable Railway (1886–1902)
  - Los Angeles Cable Railway (1889–1896)
- New York City
  - West Side and Yonkers Patent Railway's Ninth Avenue Line
  - New York and Brooklyn Bridge Railway
  - Third Avenue Railroad's 125th Street Crosstown Line
  - Third Avenue Railroad's Third Avenue Line
  - Metropolitan Street Railway's Broadway Line
  - Metropolitan Street Railway's Broadway and Columbus Avenue Line
  - Metropolitan Street Railway's Broadway and Lexington Avenue Line
  - IRT Ninth Avenue Line (defunct)
- Newark, New Jersey (1888–1889)
- Oakland, California
  - Oakland Cable Railway (1886–1899)
  - Piedmont Cable Company (1890–1898)
- Omaha, Nebraska
- Philadelphia, Pennsylvania
- Pittsburgh, Pennsylvania
- Portland, Oregon (1890–1904)
- Providence, Rhode Island (1888–1895)
- St. Louis, Missouri
- Saint Paul, Minnesota
- San Diego, California (1890–1892)
- Seattle, Washington (1888–1940) (see Seattle Municipal Street Railway)
- Sioux City, Iowa
- Spokane, Washington (1899–1936)
- Tacoma, Washington (1891–1938)
- Tulsa, Oklahoma
- Washington, D.C. (1890–1899, part of the Washington streetcar system)
- Wichita, Kansas

== See also ==
- Aerial tramway
- Cable car – Disambiguation
- Cable railway
- Cable ferry
- Cable Liner
- Charabanc
- Elevator
- Funicular
- Glasgow Subway
- Grade (slope)
- IRT Ninth Avenue Line
- List of funicular railways
- Rack railway (Cog railway)
- Reaction ferry
- San Francisco cable car system
