= Cinéma du Panthéon =

Movie Theater in Paris

Coordinates: 48°50′51.04″N 2°20′32.22″E

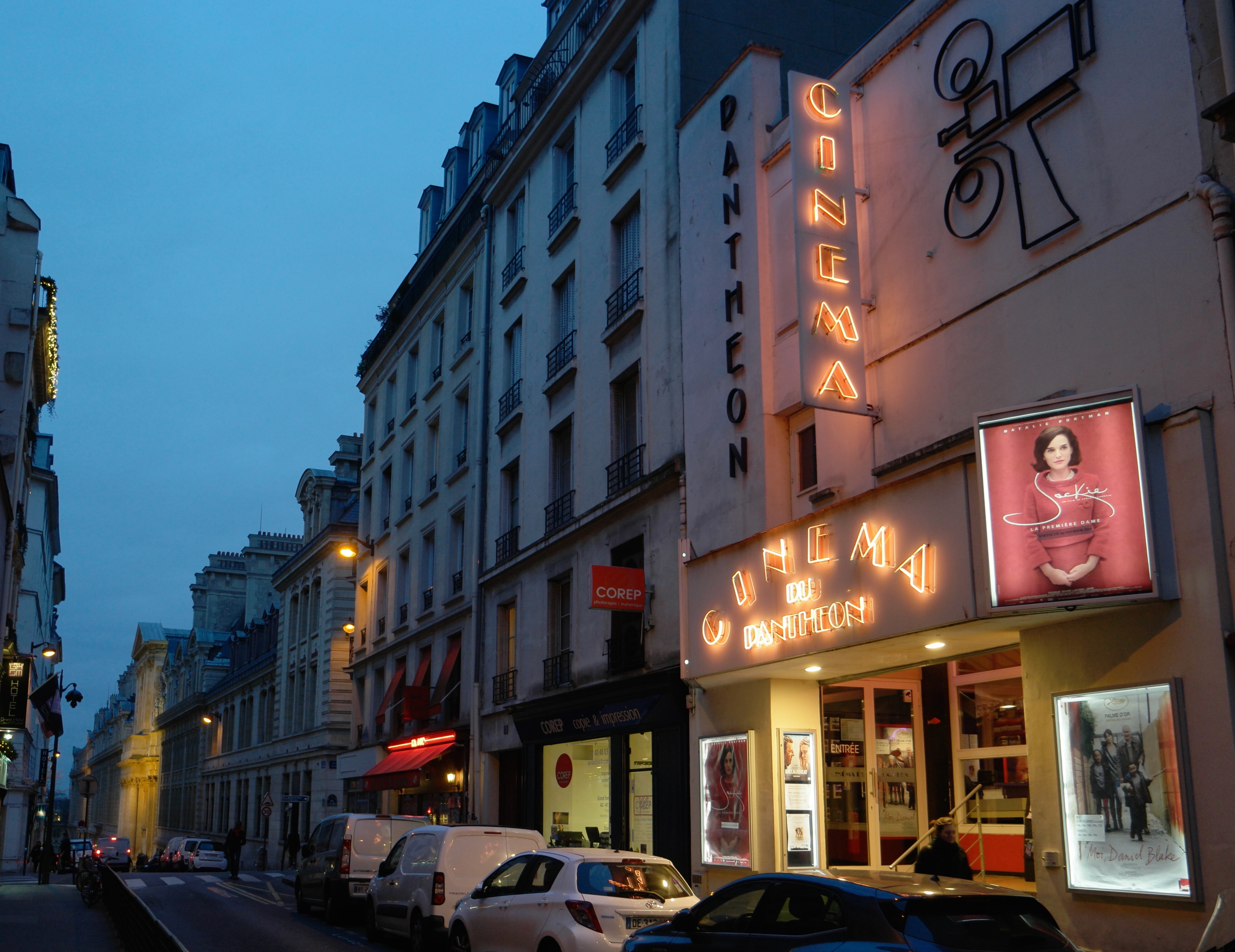
Facade of Cinéma du Panthéon.

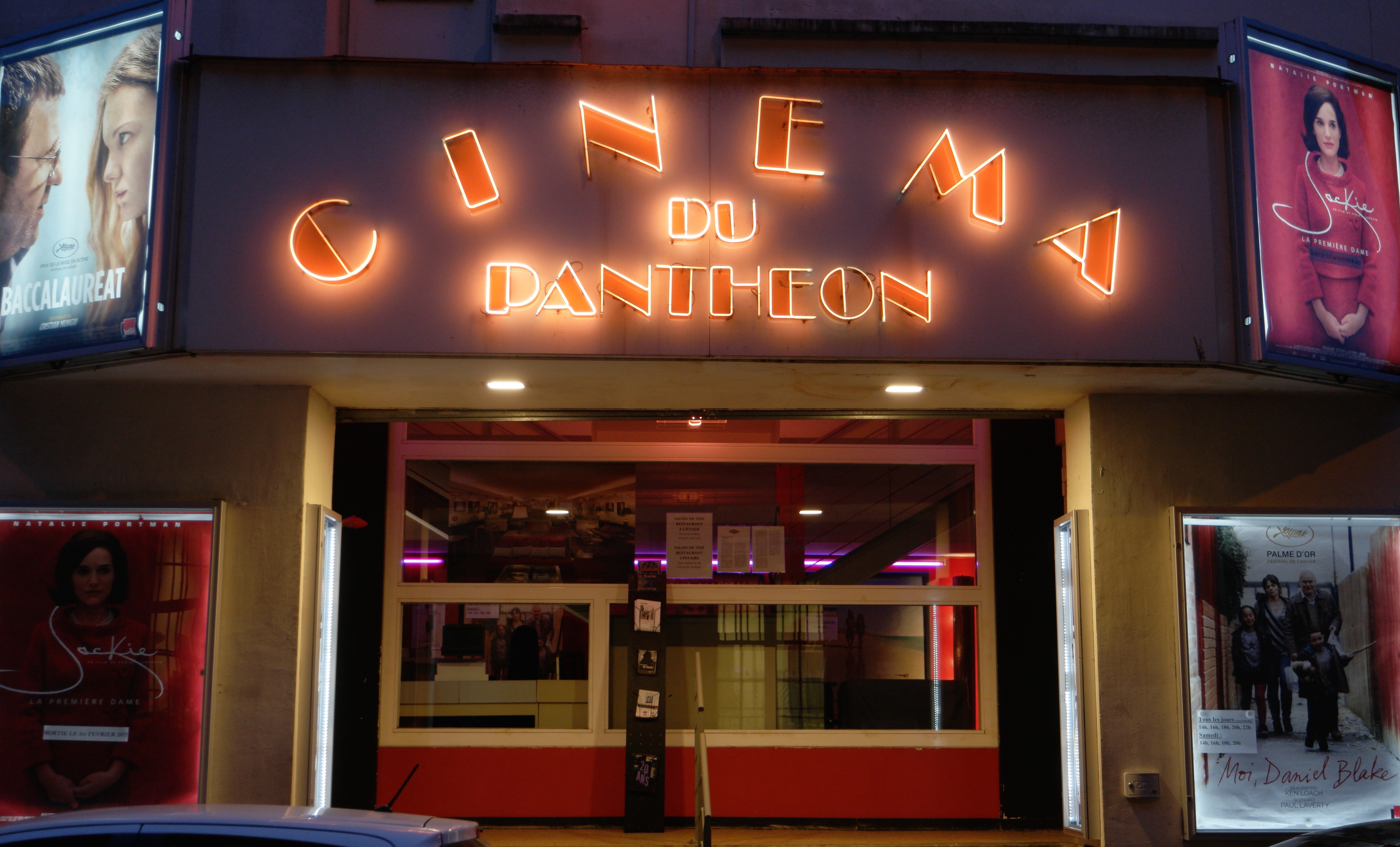
Entrance with evening lighting.

The Cinéma du Panthéon is a movie theater in Paris. It has been in uninterrupted operation for over 100 years.

== History ==
Opened in 1907 on the site of a gymnasium next to the Sorbonne, the Cinéma du Panthéon's single screen has been in daily service since.

From 1929 to 1990 it belonged to Pierre Braunberger, the producer of François Truffaut and Alain Resnais. Jean-Paul Sartre described his visit to the cinema as a young child in Les Mots:

"We followed the usher, tripping up, I felt furtive; above our heads a beam of white light crossed the room, you could see the smoke and dust dancing."

The cinema pioneered the projection of foreign films undubbed, before the existence of subtitles.

== Programming ==
The Cinéma du Panthéon specialises in independent films. Its upstairs café, decorated by Catherine Deneuve and Christian Sapet, hosts debates and other events.
