= Bergakungen =

Cinema in Gothenburg

Coordinates: 57°42′8″N 11°59′11″E

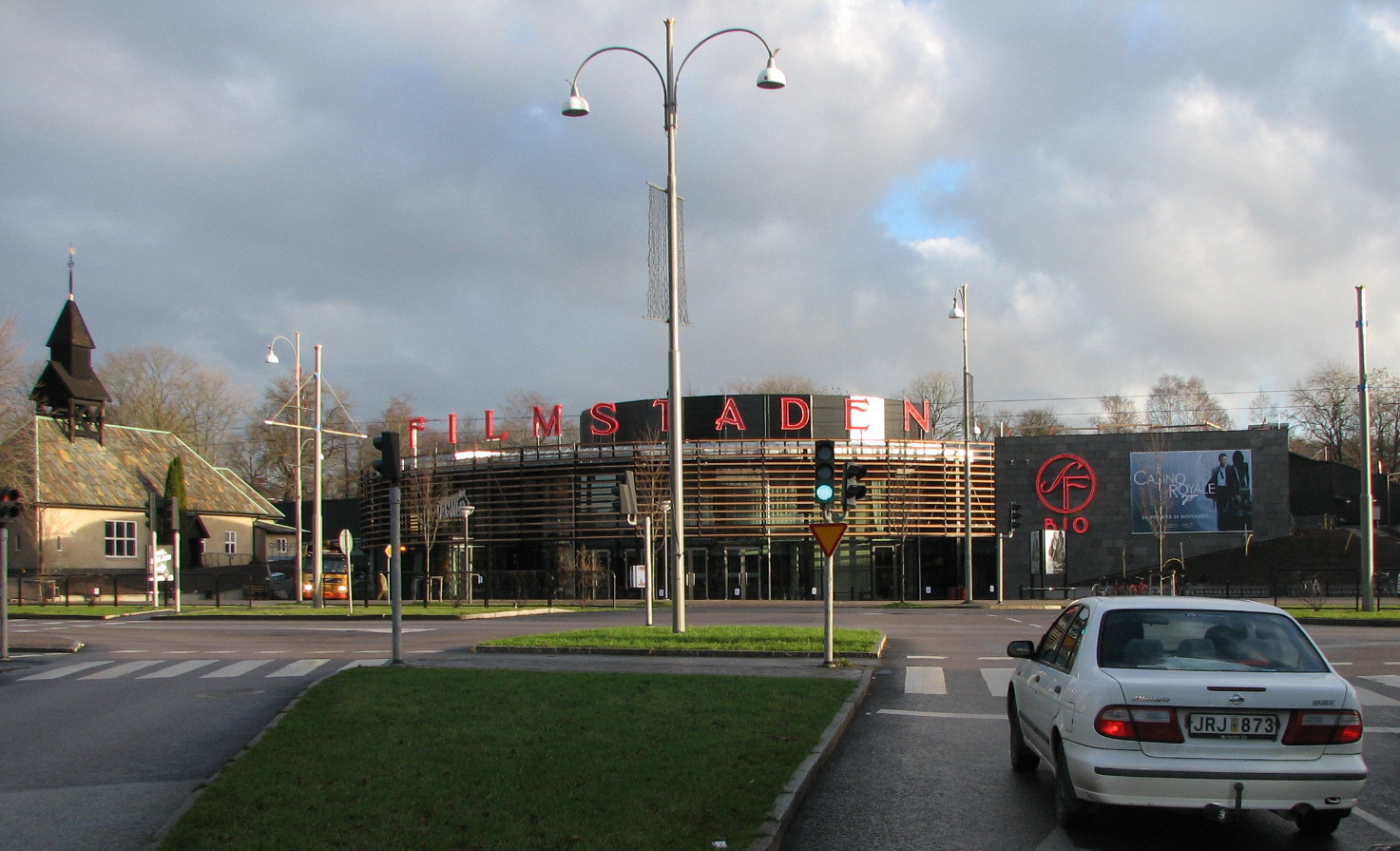
Bergakungen

SF Filmstaden Bergakungen (English: Mountain King Film City) is a cineplex located in Gothenburg, Sweden. Bergakungen has 14 cinemas with a total capacity of 2,260 visitors. The cinema has two of Sweden's largest projection screens, measuring 18 m × 8 m (59 ft × 26 ft) each.

Bergakungen also has a VIP cinema section with an adjacent lounge with and a bar. The VIP section has more comfortable seats.
