= Leader Theater =

Building in Philadelphia

- U.S. National Register of Historic Places
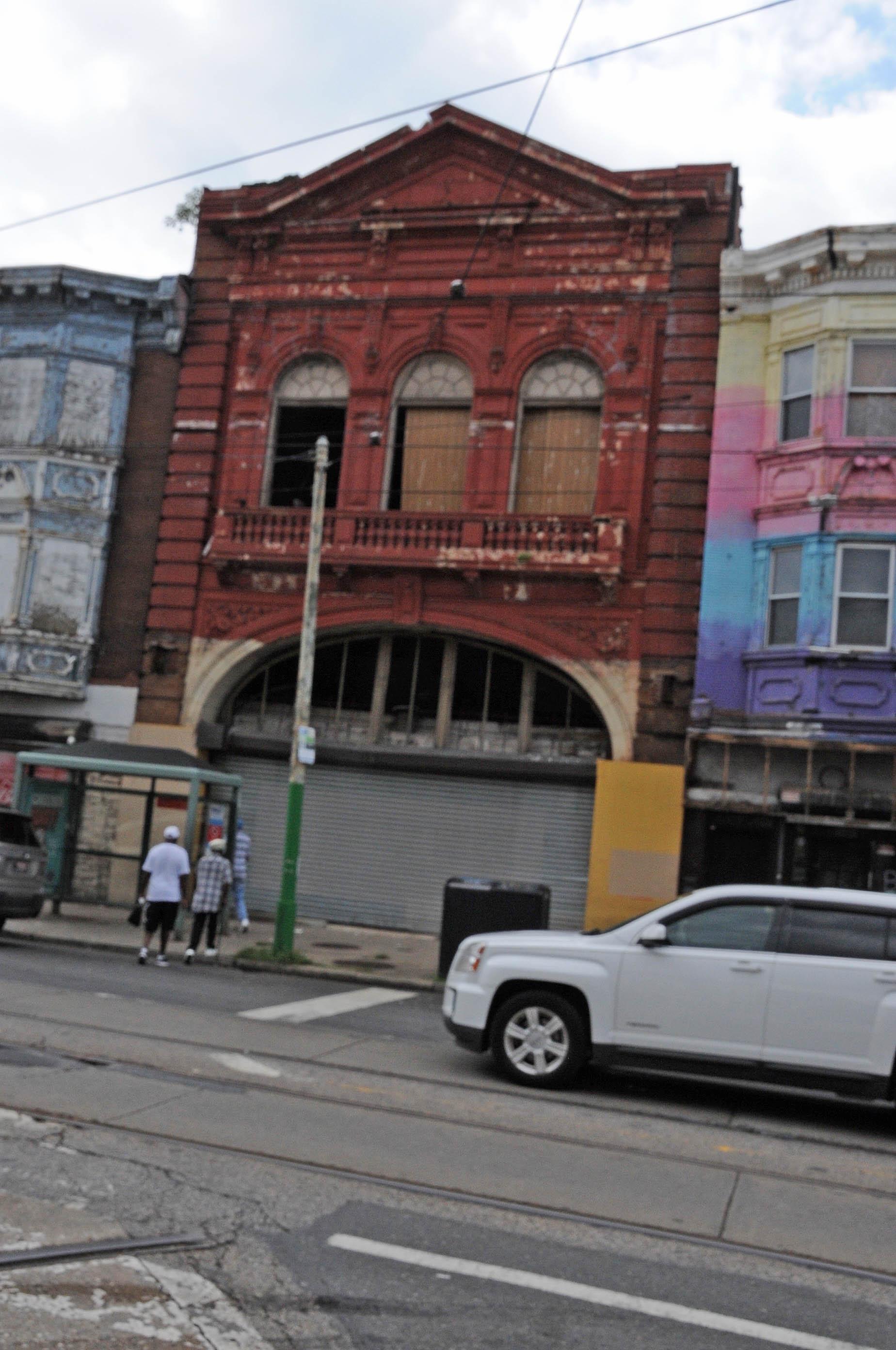
- Theater in 2021 prior to restoration
- Location: 4102-4104 Lancaster Avenue, Philadelphia, Pennsylvania
- Coordinates: 39.9652°N 75.2056°W
- Built: 1912 1935 (remodel) 1971 (cladding)
- Architect: John D. Allen
- NRHP reference No.: 100006793
- Added to NRHP: August 9, 2021

Leader Theater is a historic building located in West Powelton in West Philadelphia. It was added as #100006793 on August 9, 2021 to the National Register of Historic Places.

== History ==
The theater was constructed in 1912 in Philadelphia on Lancaster Ave, and was constructed by John D. Allen. It was built for an estimated cost of $80,000 by Jennie Effinger (nee Pragheimer), a Jewish businesswoman and member of Keneseth Israel who operated also the Strand Theatre in Tioga and several apartments in the city. It was opened on October 23 of that year and had a capacity of 988 people. It was the first motion picture theater in the city to have a theater organ, and was only six months behind New York City, who had also installed their first. Effinger had stated that she was inspired by a rendition of The Storm at the Baptist Temple to get such an organ, in lieu of a piano, for the location.

It was acquired in the early 1920s by Fred G. Nixon-Nirdlinger, and in 1931, it was operated by Warner Bros. Circuit Management Corp. It was remodelled in 1935 by John Eberson.

In 1963, three projectionists sued the theater for alleging job discrimination in favor of African-Americans, who could be paid cheaper wages.

The theater was closed on December 16, 1968. and was subsequently sold to the Police Athletic League. The building itself was cladded in 1971 and from 1987 onwards was used as a discount store. The store later closed and the cladding was removed. Renovations began in early 2023 to restore the building to its historic condition. A community event was held there later that September.
