= Safari Cinema =

Former cinema in Croydon, London, England

Coordinates: 51°22′57″N 0°6′27″W

Safari Cinema was an entertainment venue at 225 London Road in Broad Green, Croydon. It was opened in 1936, and closed in 2004. The building was demolished in 2005, and was described at the time as "the last of the historic cinemas from the Golden Age left in Croydon".

It was previously known as the Savoy (1936-1958), ABC Croydon (1958-1986) and the Cannon (1986-late 1990s).

== History ==
Opened on 9 March 1936, by Associated British Cinemas, it was designed by William R. Glen and seated 2,300. It was a fair distance from the town centre. Lighting in the large spacious auditorium was entirely indirect, mainly from troughs on the ceiling.

On 31 March 1953, an electrical fault resulted in a fire that totally destroyed the auditorium. Post-war building restrictions were still in force and it reopened with a utilitarian appearance on 27 December 1953. In July 1958 it closed to allow a more extensive reconstruction to take place. When it reopened as the ABC on 19 October, it had 2,118 seats and was lavishly appointed.

Tripling caused the next closure, from May to November 1972. The rear circle became 650-seat screen 1, with the stalls split into screen 2 (390 seats) and 3 (187 seats). All had simple unadorned decor. Renamed Cannon in 1986 and Safari in the late 1990s, it closed in 2004 and was demolished in March and April 2005.

== Closure ==
It closed primarily because of opening of a Warner Village cinema (now Vue) in the Grants entertainment venue. Safari had been known as a Bollywood cinema, showing many Bollywood films as well as Hollywood blockbusters. After the closure Warner Village reserved one screen for Bollywood films

The decision to demolish the cinema did not proceed without controversy, with local residents and patrons of the cinema remarking that the cinema "is the last of the historic cinemas from the Golden Age left in Croydon."

== Land usage ==
Developers planned to demolish the building and replace it with 138 apartments, including 52 key worker shared-ownership flats. The plan was dependent on the issuance of planning permission. This was duly granted and in September 2007 development was underway. Overstrand Ltd are the owners of the site, with Ian Hutchinson as the developer.

Subsequently, the developers applied to Croydon Council for permission to construct 47 additional apartments on the site of the derelict Total/Elf/Fina petrol station, also on London Road.
