= Cable Car Cinema =

Movie theater in Providence, Rhode Island

Coordinates: 41°49′23″N 71°24′20″W

Cable Car Cinema and Cafe
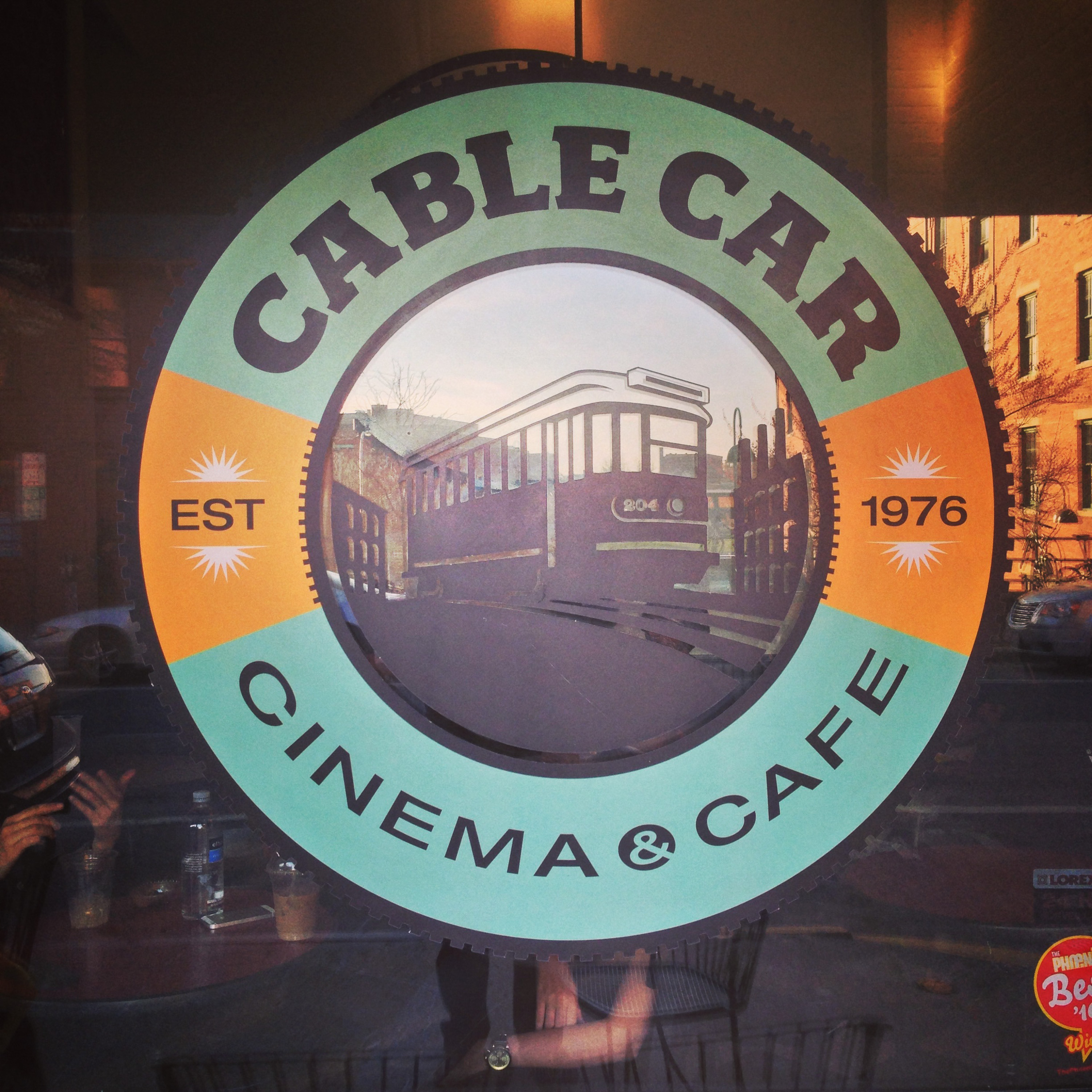
- Interactive map of Cable Car Cinema and Cafe
- Address: 204 South Main Street; Providence, Rhode Island; United States

Construction
- Opened: 1976
- Closed: 2018

Website
- https://cablecarcinema.com/

Cable Car Cinema and Cafe was a 100-seat, single-screen independent movie theater and restaurant in Providence, Rhode Island. Raymond Bilodeau opened the cinema in 1976 in a former truck garage on North Main Street at the foot of College Hill, and the business formed long-term relationships with the neighborhood's Brown University and the Rhode Island School of Design (RISD). Commercially unsuccessful at first, it eventually attracted a loyal community of cinephiles. It became known for its loveseat-style seating, and for screening foreign, independent, experimental, and classic films. It was renovated in 1989 to include a café, which became an attraction in its own right, and again after ownership changed hands to Daniel Kamil and Emily Steffian in 2008. In 2014, it was one of the first theaters to screen the controbersial film The Interview. Due to competition from streaming services and multiplexes, the owners decided to close in 2018 when they could not come to an arrangement with RISD, the building's owner, to buy the building for themselves.

== Description ==
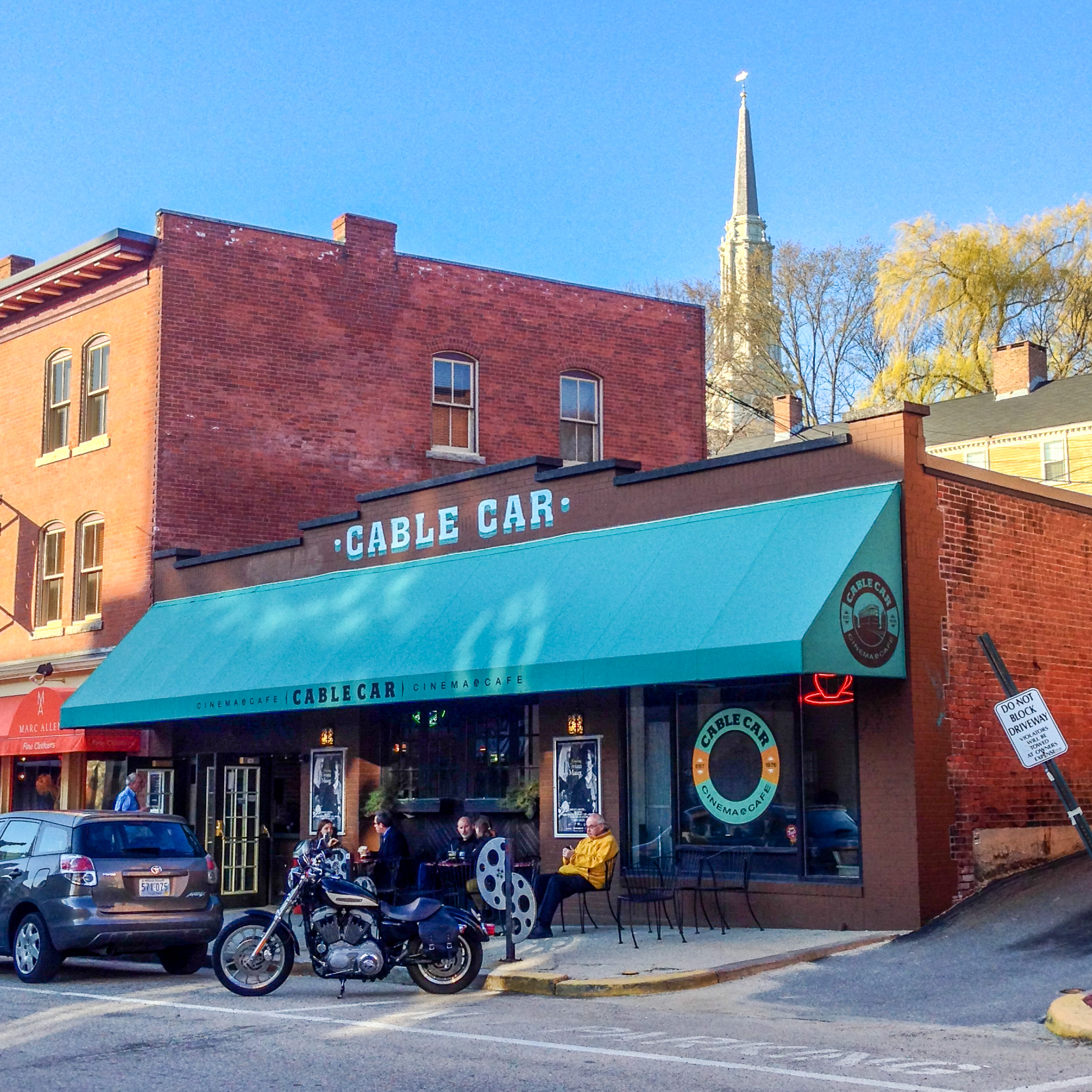
Cable Car Cinema in 2014

Cable Car Cinema operated at 204 South Main Street in Providence, at the foot of College Hill, in a building owned by the Rhode Island School of Design. The 100-seat, one-screen theater focused on foreign, independent, experimental, and classic movies catering to the taste of its patrons. It formed relationships with both RISD and Brown, with arrangements for special screenings for classes or homework since at least 1988. In addition to its film selection, it became known for its loveseat couches among rows of more typical theater seating. At one time, movies were preceded by a local singer performing a version of "Teddy Bears' Picnic". Walls were covered with a variety of film posters reflecting the cinema's tastes.

The cafe supplied food and drinks, including alcoholic beverages, during the movies and functioned as an additional source of revenue during the day, opening in the morning to cater to students. According to the Boston Globe, one of the attractions were "the impromptu salons that could stretch for hours while patrons discussed art, local politics, the Pats, and potholes". According to the owners, ticket sales only accounted for about 35-40% of total revenue.

The space hosted several film festivals: Providence French Film Festival (sponsored by Brown University), Providence Latin-American Film Festival, the Providence Africana Film Festival, the Children's Film Festival, and the Magic Lantern Screening Series of experimental and avant garde work.

== History ==
The cinema opened in 1976 in a moving company's former truck garage and took its name from a cable car which had been left in the garage. The owner, Raymond Bilodeau, converted it into a theater and concession stand. His interior design incorporated the use of couches as seating, which he had previously implemented in another theater he owned in Bristol. Although the initial design intended to fix the namesake cable car and display it on the roof, its location on South Main Street meant it was part of a historic district, and the proposal to do so was rejected by the Providence Historic District Commission.

Opening night in 1976 was a failure, with no customers buying tickets, and the business took several years to find an audience. At the time, that area of Providence was considered dangerous, and for some time the doors were locked after films began. In 1989, as the cinema grew in popularity, Bilodeau reworked the interior to convert a storage area and bathroom into a cafe and kitchen, dispensing with the one-worker operation that had been in place since it opened. Bilodeau passed management to his nephew, Eric Bilodeau, in 1990.

In 2008, the cinema was purchased by married couple Daniel Kamil and Emily Steffian. The pair were independent cinema enthusiasts who ran an even smaller, 50-seat theater called The Revival House out of a mixed use commercial building in Westerly, Rhode Island, living in the apartment above it, from 2003 to 2007.

The space underwent renovations in 2010, upgrading the cafe's kitchen and staff space, improving the electrical system, upgrading some audio and video components, and redecorating. Shortly thereafter, with 35mm film becoming obsolete, Cable Car had to upgrade to a digital projection system and turned to Kickstarter to crowdfund the change.

The cinema attracted some attention for being one of the first to show the controversial film, The Interview, after North Korean hackers attacked Sony Pictures Entertainment and threatened theaters considering a screening.

In 2015, the owners of the cinema started a non-profit, the Providence Center for Media Culture, using film and media for community engagement and education. The nonprofit arm coordinated the Civics & Politics Film Series and Portals: The History of the Future Film Series at the Providence Public Library.

The cinema closed on May 27, 2018, after 42 years. Although it was profitable, Kamil and Steffian predicted increasing financial challenges and saw buying the building as essential for their long-term security, giving them the ability to add another floor and expand the number of screens beyond the one. They could not come to an arrangement with the building's owner, RISD, and declined an offer of lower rent. Variety cited the Cable Car as "a prime example" of the difficulties that small, independent theaters face when competing with new multiplexes and streaming services.

== Reception ==
The cinema built up a community of loyal customers. According to Variety, it "inspired fierce devotion among its regulars, a collection of Brown and Rhode Island School of Design students, professors, artists and cinephiles."

It received a number of recognitions over the years. It was in a top 10 list of national theaters by Entertainment Weekly in 2005. In 2009, Box Office Magazine gave it their Marquee Award, designating it a "National Marquee Theater". In 2015, the Sundance Institute's Art House Convergence named it one of 23 national Art House Project theaters.
