= Northrup Theater =

- U.S. National Register of Historic Places
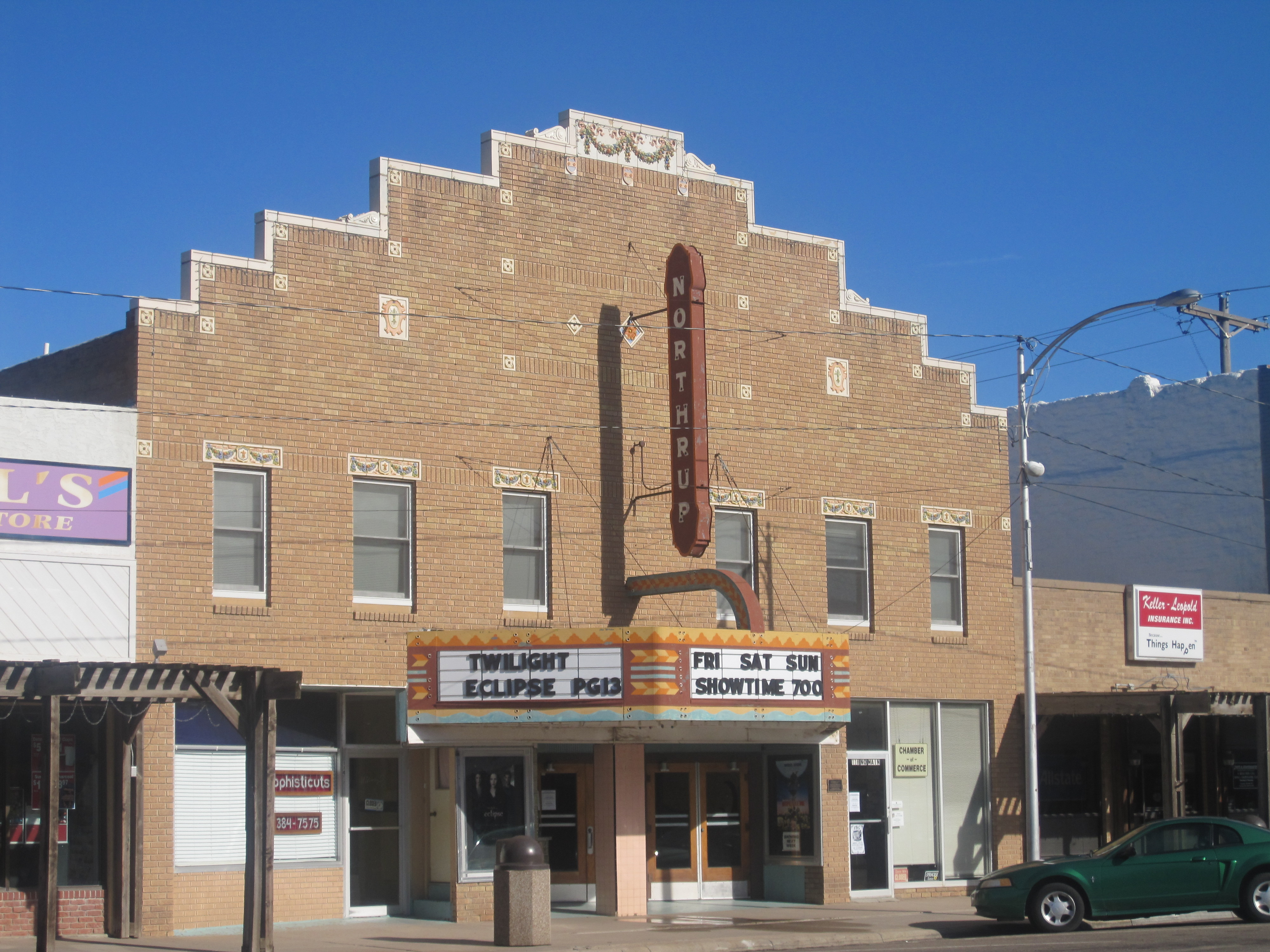

- Location within Kansas Location within the United States
- Location: 116 N. Main St., Syracuse, Kansas
- Coordinates: 37°59′3″N 101°45′8″W
- Area: less than one acre
- Built: 1930
- Built by: LaRosh & Sons Construction
- Architectural style: Mission Revival/Spanish Revival
- MPS: Theaters and Opera Houses of Kansas MPS
- NRHP reference No.: 05000008
- Added to NRHP: February 9, 2005

The Northrup Theater was built in Syracuse, Kansas in 1930 by local businessman Frank F. Northrup. At the time of its construction it was billed as the largest movie theater in western Kansas. The theater continues to show movies, and is owned by the Syracuse/Hamilton Chamber of Commerce.

== Description ==
The Northrup Theatre is a 2 1/2-story masonry building. The original structure is styled as an adaptation of the Mission Revival style, with Moderne elements added in a 1948 renovation. The main facade facing Main Street uses textured blond brick, capped by a stepped parapet and embellished with terra cotta detailing. The parapet conceals the theater's bowstring truss roof system. The theater's main entrance is flanked by two storefronts. A curved glass block ticket booth stands in the recessed theater entrance, under a metal marquee. A large vertical sign is placed directly above the marquee, with NORTHRUP on either side.

The structure is brick and hollow clay tile with a steel truss roof, on a concrete foundation. The side walls are party walls with the adjoining buildings. The rear elevation is a plain brick wall with a large opening for the theater's original evaporative cooling system.

The Northrup Theater was placed on the National Register of Historic Places on February 9, 2005.
