= Cable cars and funiculars in Los Angeles =

Form of street railway extant 1885 to 1902

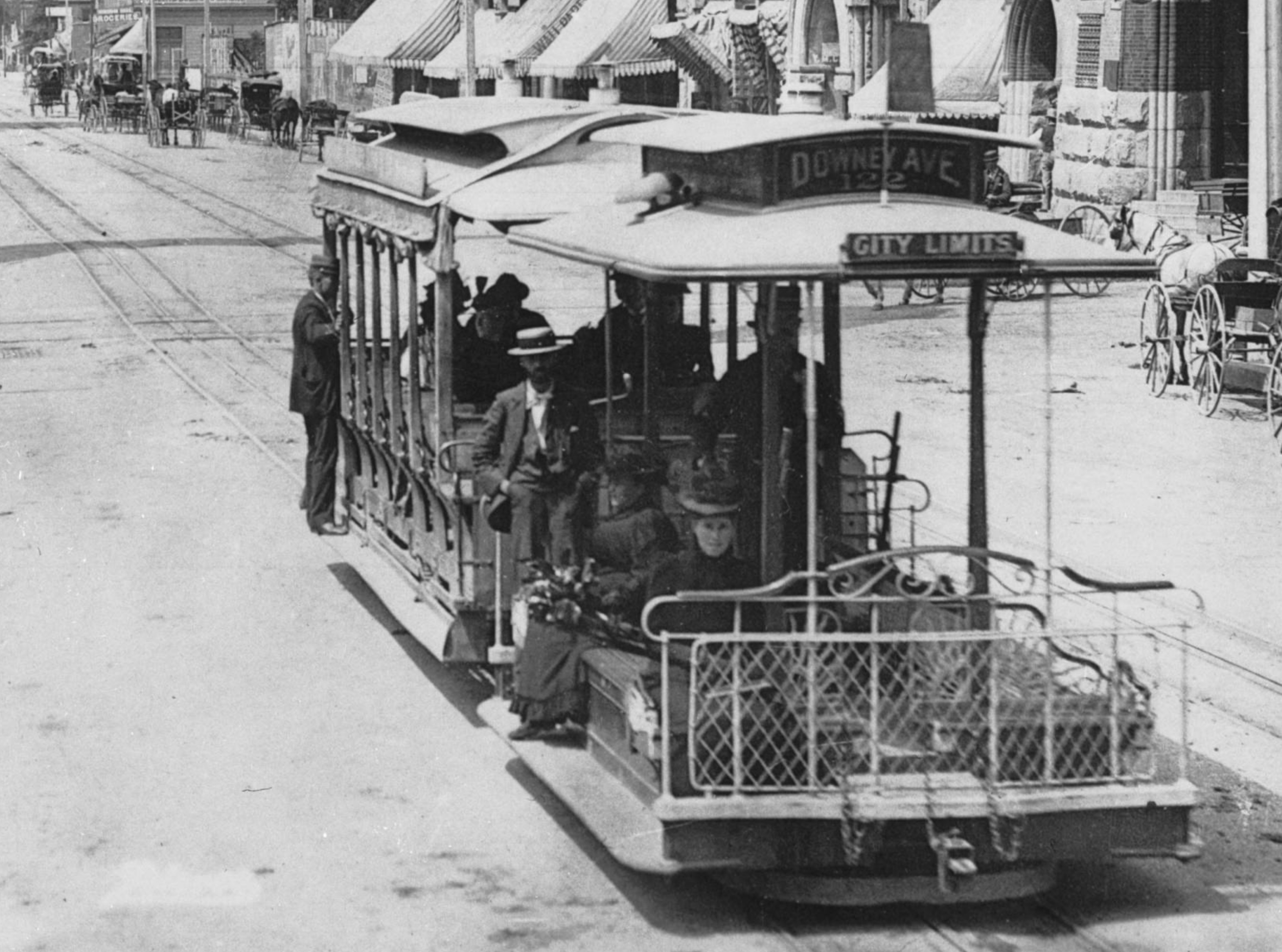
Cable car on Broadway just north of 2nd Street looking south, Los Angeles, c. 1893–1895

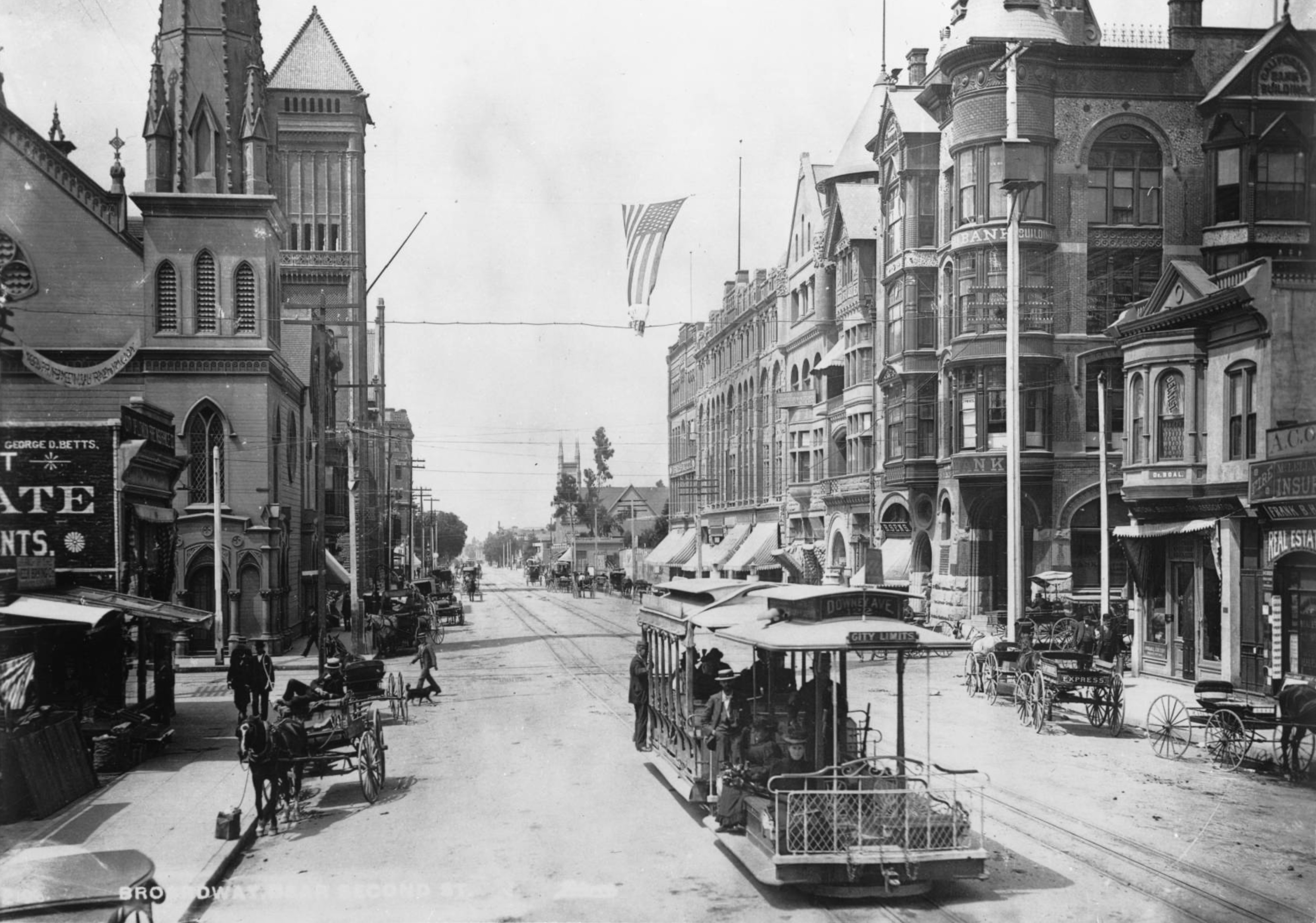
Above image zoomed out, Los Angeles, c. 1893–1895

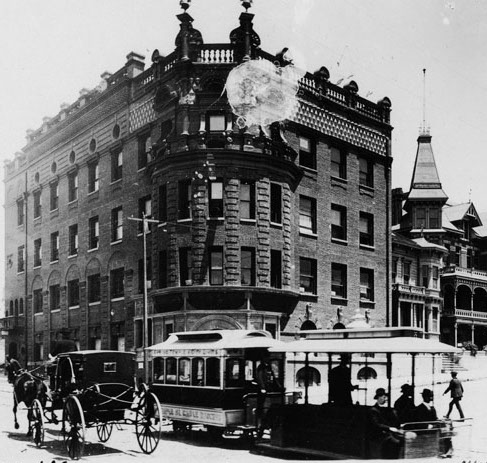
The Women's Christian Temperance Union building, also known as Temperance Temple, at Temple and Fort (now Broadway) streets, with a Temple Street Cable Railway car, 1890

Cable car street railways first began operating in Los Angeles in 1885 and lasted until 1902, when the lines were electrified and electric streetcars were introduced largely following the cable car routes. There were roughly 25 miles (40 km) of routes, connecting 1st and Main in what was then the Los Angeles Central Business District as far as the communities known today as Lincoln Heights, Echo Park/Filipinotown, and the Pico-Union district.

The first cable cars climbed Bunker Hill on October 8, 1885. A total of three companies operated in the period through 1902.

== Los Angeles Cable Railway ==
The Los Angeles Cable Railway operated the system of the greatest length at 108,274 feet (21 mi; 33 km) of track, featuring: 99,328 feet (19 mi; 30 km) of straight surface tracks; 4,250 feet (1,300 m) of viaducts, 2,124 feet (650 m) of bridges, 2,010 feet (610 m) of curves, and 562 feet (170 m) of pits. It operated the following lines as of August 1888:

- Buena Vista St. line, Downtown to today's Chinatown: 1st & Main via Main, Bellevue (now Sunset) via Buena Vista (now N. Broadway) to College St.
- Aliso St. line, Downtown to today's Boyle Heights: from Arcadia & Main via Aliso, Pleasant, and First to Evergreen & First
- Blue line: Downtown to today's Pico-Union district: from Temple & Main via Main to First to Spring to Ninth to Pearl (now Figueroa) to Pico to Washington Bl. to Vermont Avenue car barn
- Olive St. line: from today's Lincoln Heights via Downtown to today's Pico-Union district: from Pritchard (now Lincoln Park Av.) and Pearl (now N. Broadway) via Pearl to Olympia, San Fernando (now N. Spring), Alameda, Main, First, Spring, Fifth, Olive, Twelfth, Figueroa, Washington to Vermont car barn
- W. 9th St. line: from today's Westlake via Downtown to today's Glassell Park: from Ninth and Grand View, via Ninth, Figueroa, Sixth, Hill, Fourth, Broadway, First, Spring, Marchessault, Main, San Fernando, Olympia, Downey (N. Broadway), Chestnut (now Avenue 20), Pasadena, Daily, to Avenue 33.
- Kuhrts St. line: Downtown to today's Lincoln Park: from the Plaza via Main to the Los Angeles River, Kuhrts (now E. Main St.), Mission Street Road to opposite the Selig Zoo.

== Temple Street Cable Railway ==
The Temple Street Cable Railway began service on July 14, 1886. It was bought by and merged into the Pacific Electric Railway, which replaced the cable cars with electric streetcar service on October 2, 1902. The route was transferred to the Los Angeles Railway in 1910. Service on the last remaining portion of the route was discontinued in 1946. The route was 8,725 feet (1.7 mi; 2.7 km) long and went along Temple St. from Spring St. west to Edgeware Road in today's Echo Park district, just southeast of Angelino Heights.

== Second Street Cable Railroad ==
The Second Street Cable Railroad began service October 8, 1885 and ended service October 13, 1889. It operated one route via Second Street west, up Bunker Hill, to Second and Texas (now Belmont) Street. The powerhouse was at Second at Boylston, now a Los Angeles Department of Water and Power installation. With a connection near the terminus at First and Belmont Avenue, the Cahuenga Valley Railroad line ran to Gardner Junction at what is now Gardner and Sunset in Hollywood; from Belmont to Temple, Coronado, south on a private right-of-way to First; on First and private right-of-way to Western and Temple, via Western to Hollywood Boulevard west and via private right-of-way to Gardner Junction. The Pacific Electric acquired this line and ran interurbans on it.

== Funiculars ==
Los Angeles also hosted several funicular railways.

=== Angels Flight ===
Angels Flight operated in Downtown Los Angeles from 1901 to 1969 when its site was cleared for redevelopment. The railway was rebuilt south of its original location in 1996. It was designated a Los Angeles Historic-Cultural Monument in 1962 and was added to the National Register of Historic Places in 2000.

=== Court Flight ===
Court Flight ran up Bunker Hill between Broadway and Hill along "Court Street", between Temple and 1st. It operated from 1905 to 1943 when it was destroyed in a fire.

=== Mount Lowe Railway ===
The Mount Lowe Railway was a tourist railway which featured a funicular section.

== See also ==
- Streetcars in Los Angeles
