= Dhaka =

Capital and largest city of Bangladesh

Dhaka ঢাকা Dacca
- Capital & Megacity
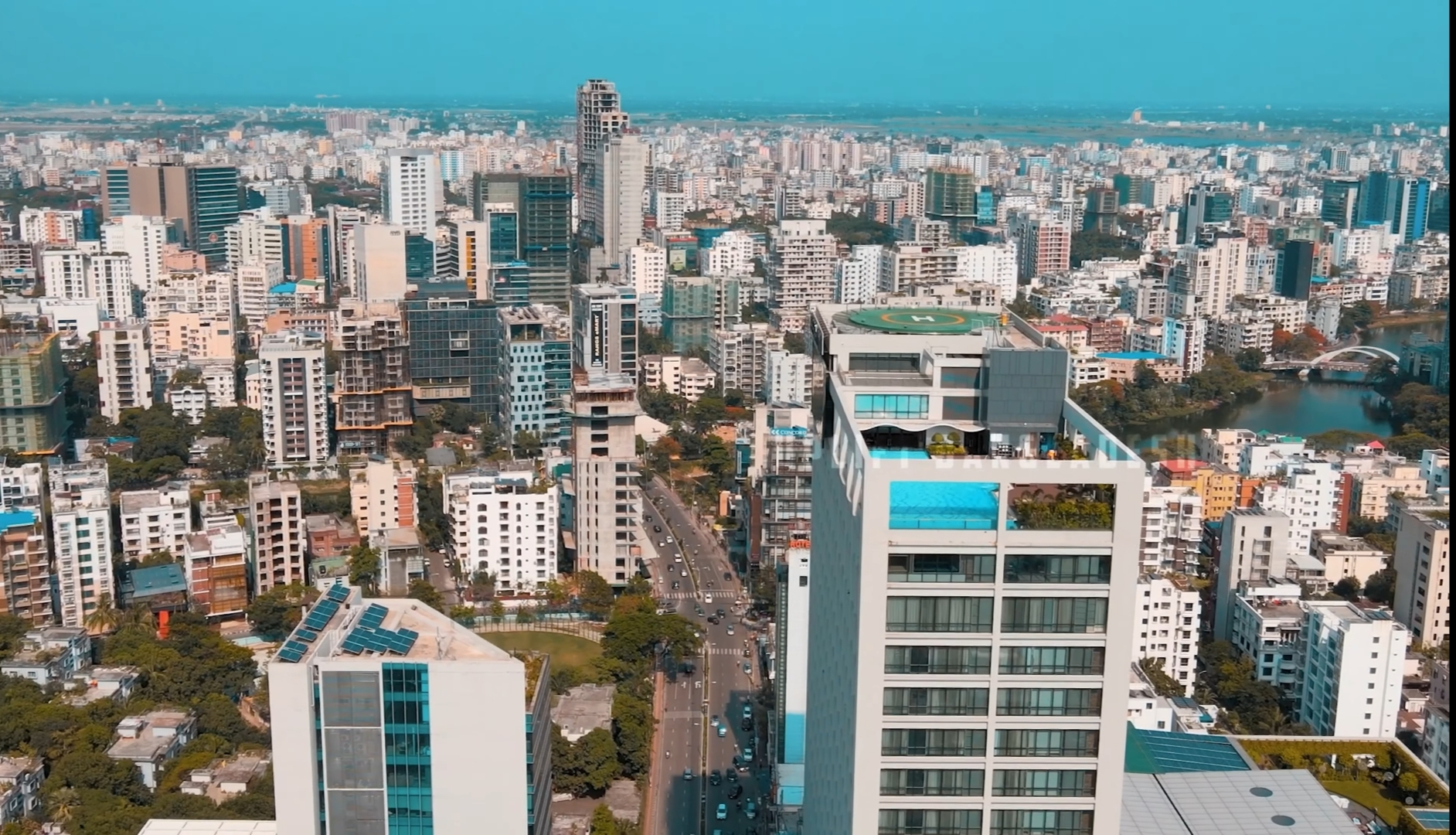
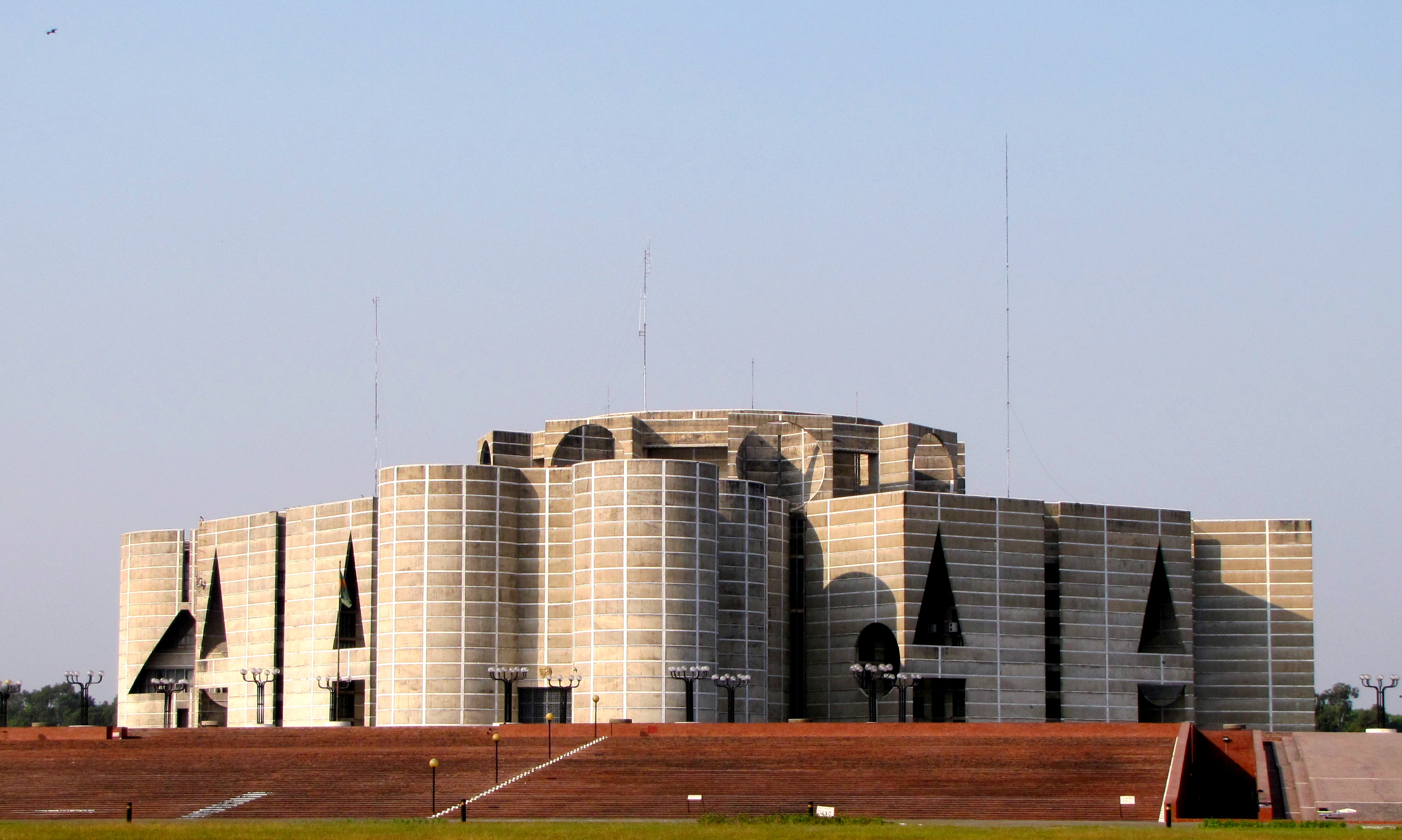
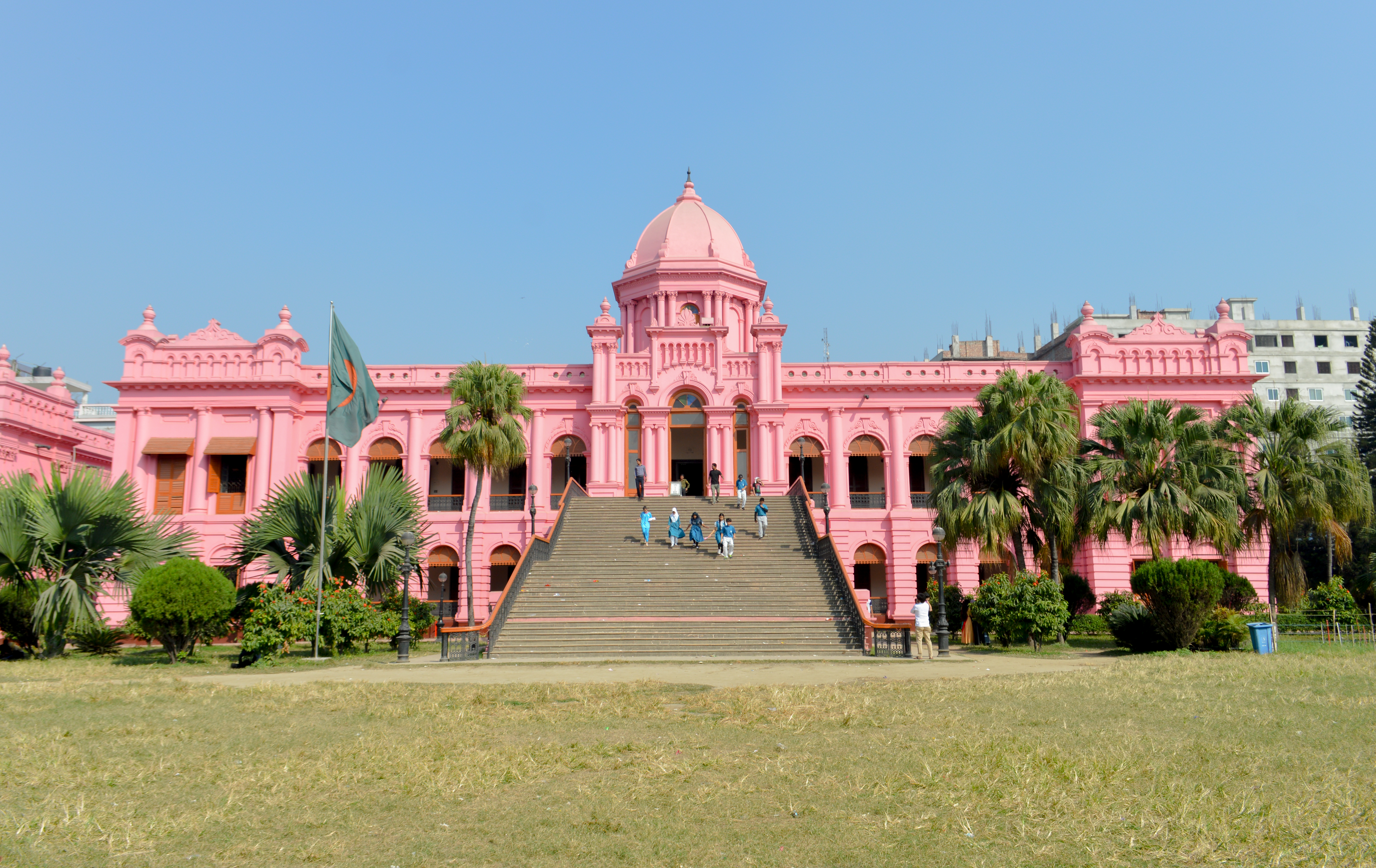
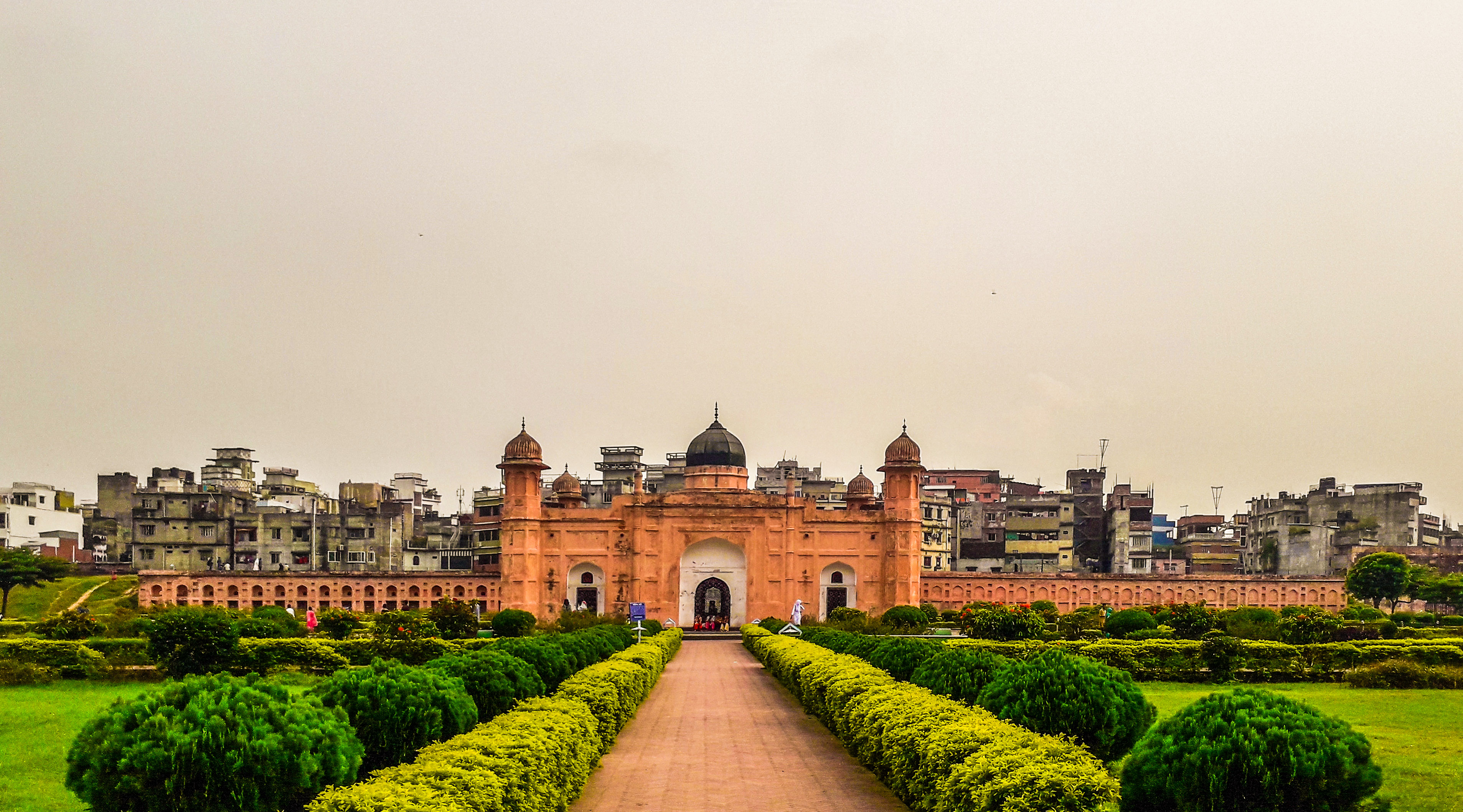
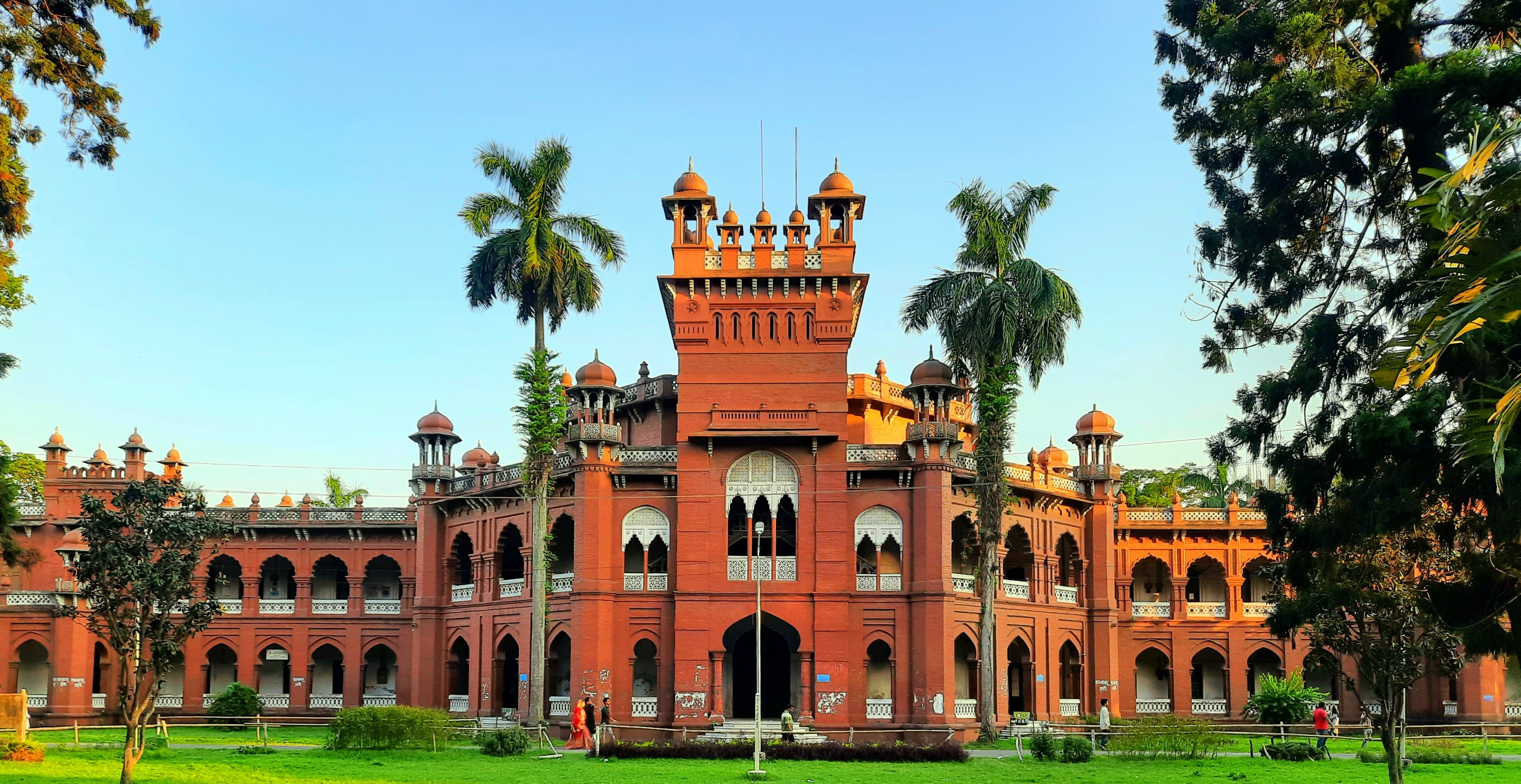
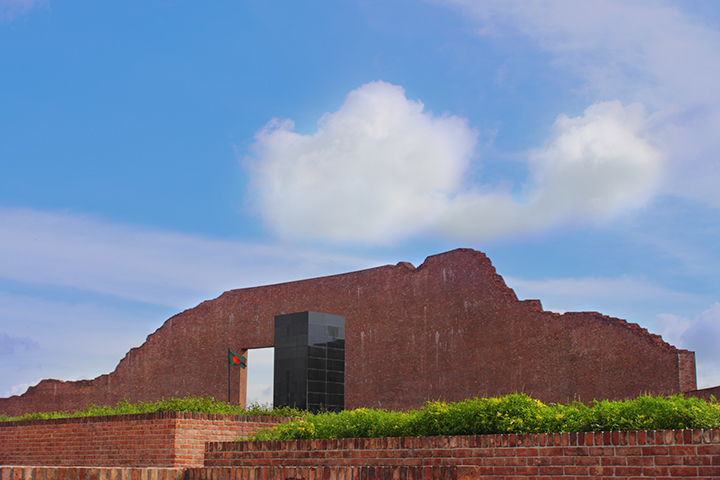
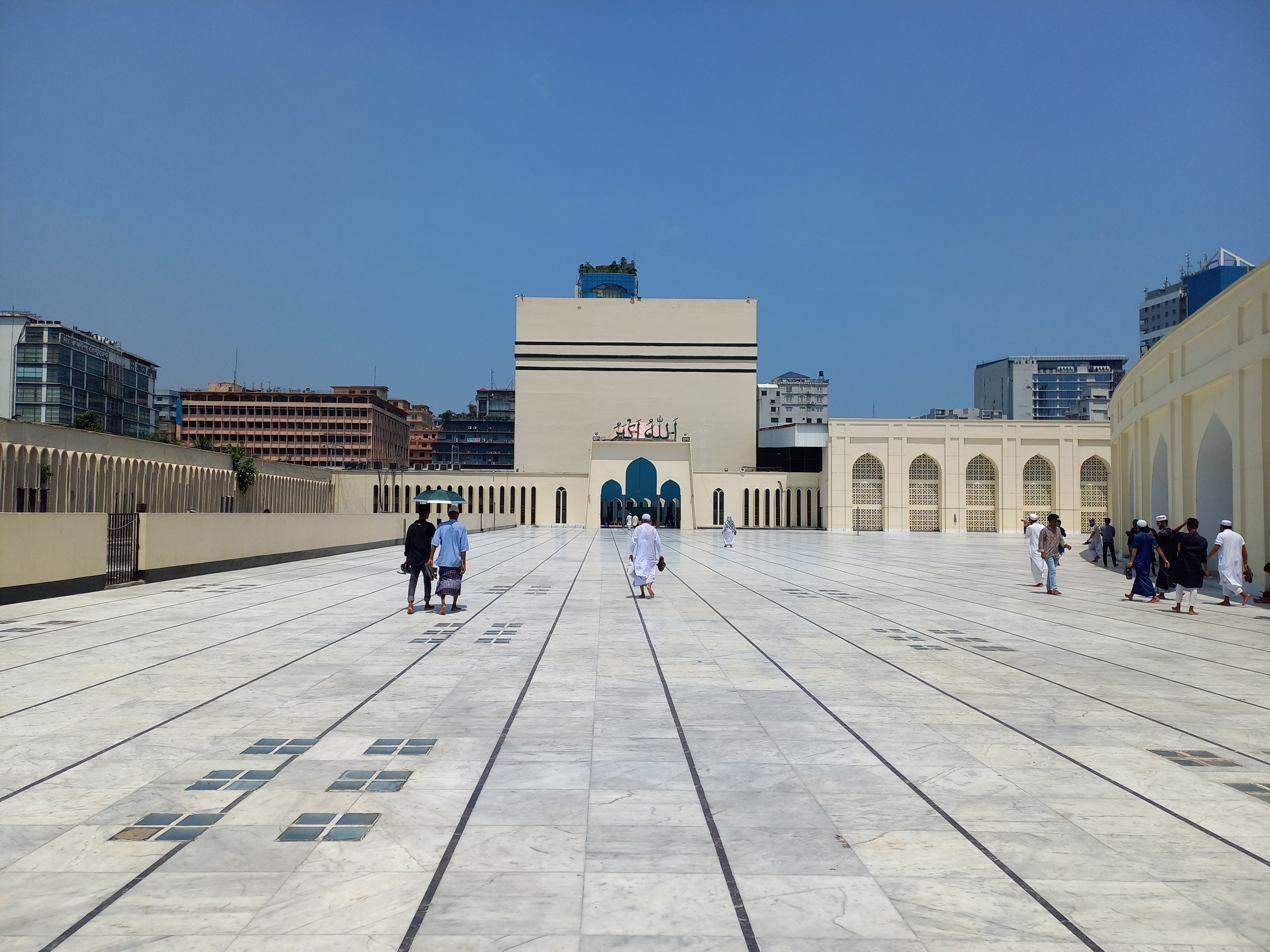
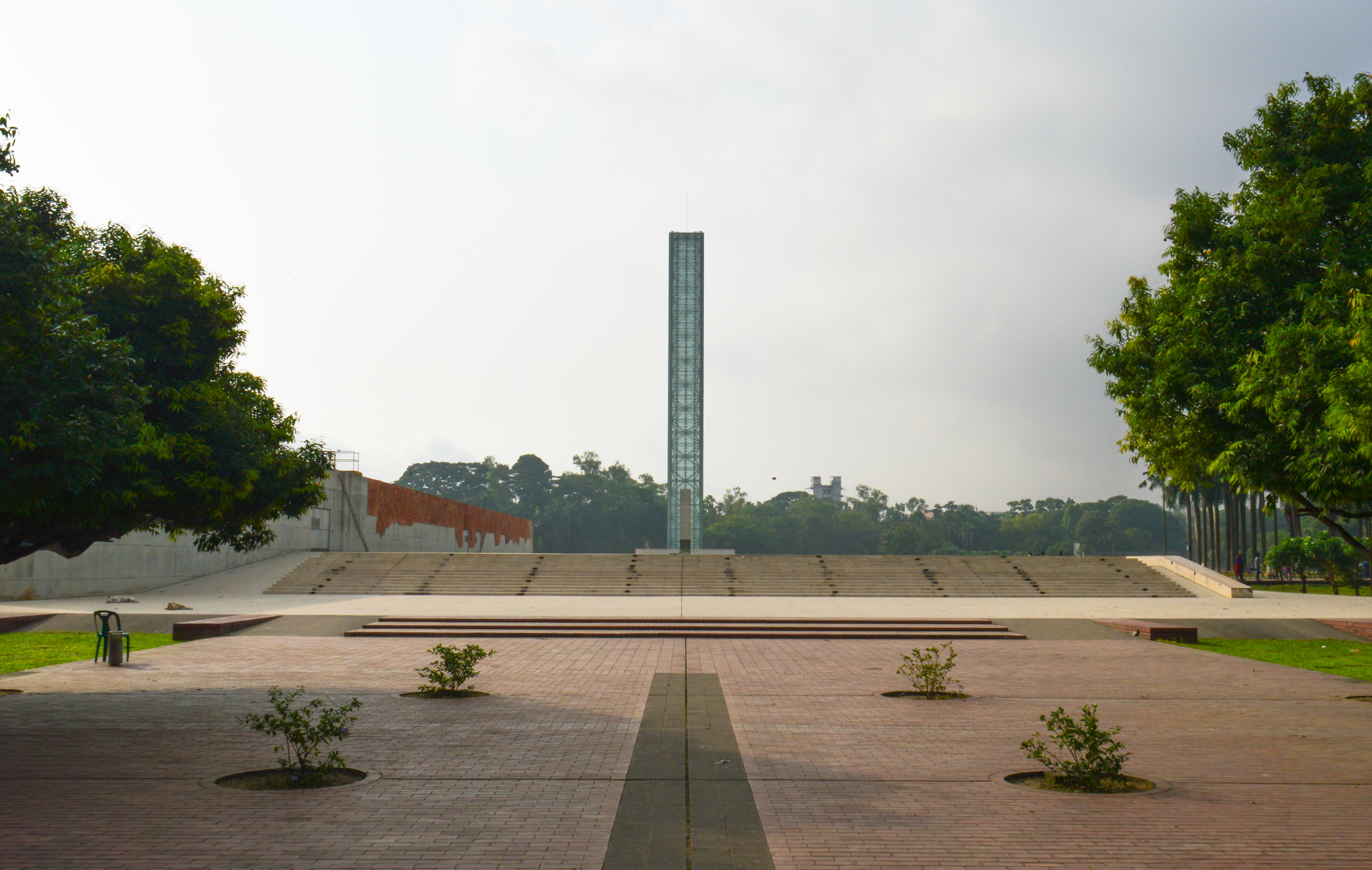
- Kamal Atatürk Avenue Jatiya Sangsad Bhaban Ahsan Manzil Lalbagh Fort Curzon Hall of the University of Dhaka Martyred Intellectuals Memorial Baitul Mukarram Independence Monument in Suhrawardy Udyan
- Nicknames: City of Mosques; City That Never Sleeps; City of Rickshaws; Venice of the East

- Location within Dhaka division Location within Bangladesh Location within South Asia Location within Asia
- Coordinates: 23°45′52″N 90°23′20″E
- Country: Bangladesh
- Division: Dhaka Division
- District: Dhaka District
- Establishment: 1610; 416 years ago (as Jahangirnagar)

Government
  - Type: Mayor–council
  - Body: DNCC and DSCC
  - North Administrator: Md Shafiqul Islam Khan
  - South Administrator: Md Abdus Salam
  - City Council: 129 constituencies
  - Parliament: 15 constituencies

Area
  - Capital & Megacity: 306 km^{2} (118 sq mi)
  - Metro: 2,569.55 km^{2} (992.11 sq mi)
- Elevation: 32 m (105 ft)

Population (2022)
  - Capital & Megacity: 10,278,882
  - Rank: 1st in Bangladesh
  - Density: 33,600/km^{2} (87,000/sq mi)
  - Metro: 36,585,479
  - Metro density: 14,238.1/km^{2} (36,876.5/sq mi)
  - City rank: 1st in Bangladesh
  - Metro rank: 1st in Bangladesh; 1st in Bengal Region; 1st in South Asia; 2nd in Asia; 2nd in the world
- Demonym(s): Dhakaiya, Dhakaites

Languages
  - Official: Bengali • English

GDP (PPP, 2026)
  - Metro: ~US$235 billion
- Time zone: UTC+06:00 (BST)
- Postal code: 1000, 1100, 12xx, 13xx
- National calling code: +880
- Vehicle registration: DHAKA-D-11-9999""111
- HDI (2023): 0.741 high · 1st of 22
- Rapid Transit: Dhaka Metro Rail
- Metropolitan Planning Authority: Rajdhani Unnayan Kartripakkha
- Water Supply and Sewerage Authority: Dhaka WASA
- UN/LOCODE: BD DAC
- Website: North Dhaka; South Dhaka

UNESCO World Heritage Site
- Official name: Rickshaws and rickshaw painting in Dhaka
- Type: Cultural
- Designated: 2023 (18th Committee of UNESCO for safeguarding of the Intangible Cultural Heritage)
- Reference no.
- Region: Southern Asia
- Notability: The Representative List of the "Intangible Cultural Heritage of Humanity" category

Dhaka (/ˈdɑːkə/ DAH-kə or /ˈdækə/ DAK-ə; Bengali: ঢাকা, romanized: Ḍhākā, pronounced [ˈɖʱaka]), formerly spelled as Dacca, is the capital and largest city of Bangladesh. With an estimated population of 36.6 million, Dhaka is the second largest city by population in the world, and is widely considered to be the most densely populated built-up urban area in the world. Dhaka is an important cultural, economic, and scientific hub of Eastern South Asia. Dhaka ranks fourth in South Asia and 55th in the world in terms of GDP. Lying on the Ganges Delta, it is bounded by the Buriganga, Turag, Dhaleshwari and Shitalakshya rivers. It is also the largest Bengali-speaking city in the world.

The area of Dhaka has been inhabited since the first millennium. An early modern city developed from the 17th century as a provincial capital and commercial centre of the Mughal Empire. Dhaka was the capital of a proto-industrialized Mughal Bengal for 75 years (1608–39 and 1660–1704). It was the hub of the muslin trade in Bengal and one of the most prosperous cities in the world. The Mughal city was named Jahangirnagar (The City of Jahangir) in honour of the erstwhile ruling emperor Jahangir. The city's wealthy Mughal elite included princes and the sons of Mughal emperors. The pre-colonial city's glory peaked in the 17th and 18th centuries, when it was home to merchants from across Eurasia. The Port of Dhaka was a major trading hub for both riverine and maritime commerce. The Mughals decorated the city with well-laid gardens, tombs, mosques, palaces, and forts. The city was once called the Venice of the East.

Under British rule, the city saw the introduction of electricity, railways, cinemas, Western-style universities and colleges, and a modern water supply. It became an important administrative and educational centre in the British Raj, as the capital of Eastern Bengal and Assam province after 1905. In 1947, after the end of British rule, the city became the administrative capital of East Pakistan. The accompanying partition of India saw an emptying of Dhaka's Hindu population—who had come to constitute a majority in the city during the previous century, and dominated its economy. It was declared the legislative capital of Pakistan in 1962. In 1971, following the Liberation War, it became the capital of an independent Bangladesh. Between 2008 and 2011, Dhaka celebrated 400 years as a municipal city.

A gamma+ global city, Dhaka is the centre of political, economic and cultural life in Bangladesh. It is the seat of the Government of Bangladesh, many Bangladeshi companies, and leading Bangladeshi educational, scientific, research, and cultural organizations. Since its establishment as a modern capital city, the population, area, and social and economic diversity of Dhaka have grown tremendously. The city is now one of the most densely industrialized regions in the country. The city accounts for 35% of Bangladesh's economy. The Dhaka Stock Exchange has over 750 listed companies. Dhaka hosts over 50 diplomatic missions, as well as the headquarters of BIMSTEC, CIRDAP, and the International Jute Study Group. Dhaka has a renowned culinary heritage. The city's culture is known for its rickshaws, Kacchi Biryani, art festivals, street food, and religious diversity. While it has a heritage of 2000 buildings from the Mughal and British periods, Dhaka's most prominent architectural landmark is the modernist Jatiya Sangsad Bhaban. The city is associated with two Nobel laureates. Dhaka's annual Bengali New Year parade, its Jamdani sari, and its rickshaw art have been recognized by UNESCO as the intangible cultural heritage of humanity. The city has produced many writers and poets in several languages, especially in Bengali and English.

== Etymology ==
The origins of the name Dhaka are uncertain. It may derive from the dhak tree, which was once common in the area, or from Dhakeshwari, the 'patron Hindu goddess' of the region. Another popular theory states that Dhaka refers to a membranophone instrument, dhak, which was played by order of Subahdar Islam Khan I during the inauguration of the Bengal capital in 1610.

Some references also say it was derived from a Prakrit dialect called Dhaka Bhasa; or Dhakkaiyya, used in the Rajtarangini, meaning a watch station; or it is the same as Davaka, mentioned in the Allahabad pillar inscription of Samudragupta as an eastern frontier kingdom. According to Rajatarangini, written by a Kashmiri Brahman, Kalhana, the region was originally known as Dhakka. The word Dhakka means watchtower. Bikrampur and Sonargaon—the earlier strongholds of Bengal rulers—were situated nearby. So, Dhaka was possibly used as the watchtower for fortification purpose.

== History ==
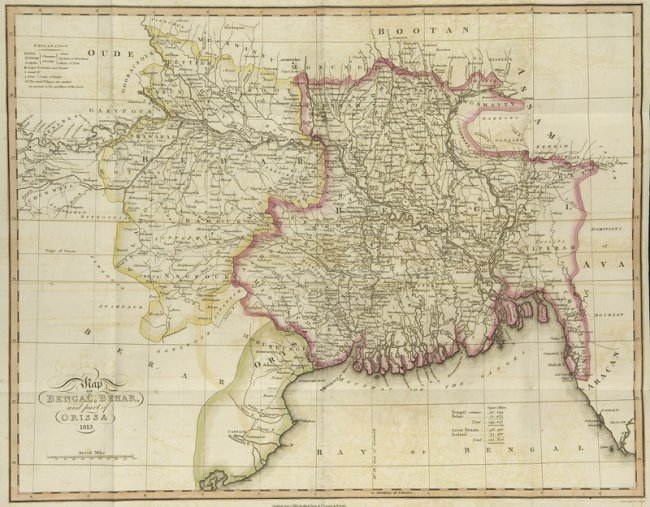
Dhaka was the capital of the Mughal province of Bengal, Bihar and Orissa

=== Pre-Mughal ===
The history of urban settlements in the area of modern-day Dhaka dates to the first millennium. The region was part of the ancient district of Bikrampur, which was ruled by the Sena dynasty. Under Islamic rule, it became part of the historic district of Sonargaon, the regional administrative hub of the Delhi and the Bengal Sultanates. The Grand Trunk Road passed through the region, connecting it with North India, Central Asia and the south-eastern port city of Chittagong. Before Dhaka, the capital of Bengal was Gour. Even earlier capitals included Pandua, Bikrampur and Sonargaon. The latter was also the seat of Isa Khan and his son Musa Khan, who both headed a confederation of twelve chieftains that resisted Mughal expansion in eastern Bengal during the late 16th century. Due to a change in the course of the Ganges, the strategic importance of Gour was lost. Dhaka was viewed with strategic importance due to the Mughal need to consolidate control in eastern Bengal. The Mughals also planned to extend their empire beyond into Assam and Arakan. Dhaka and Chittagong became the eastern frontiers of the Mughal Empire.

=== Early period of Mughal Bengal ===
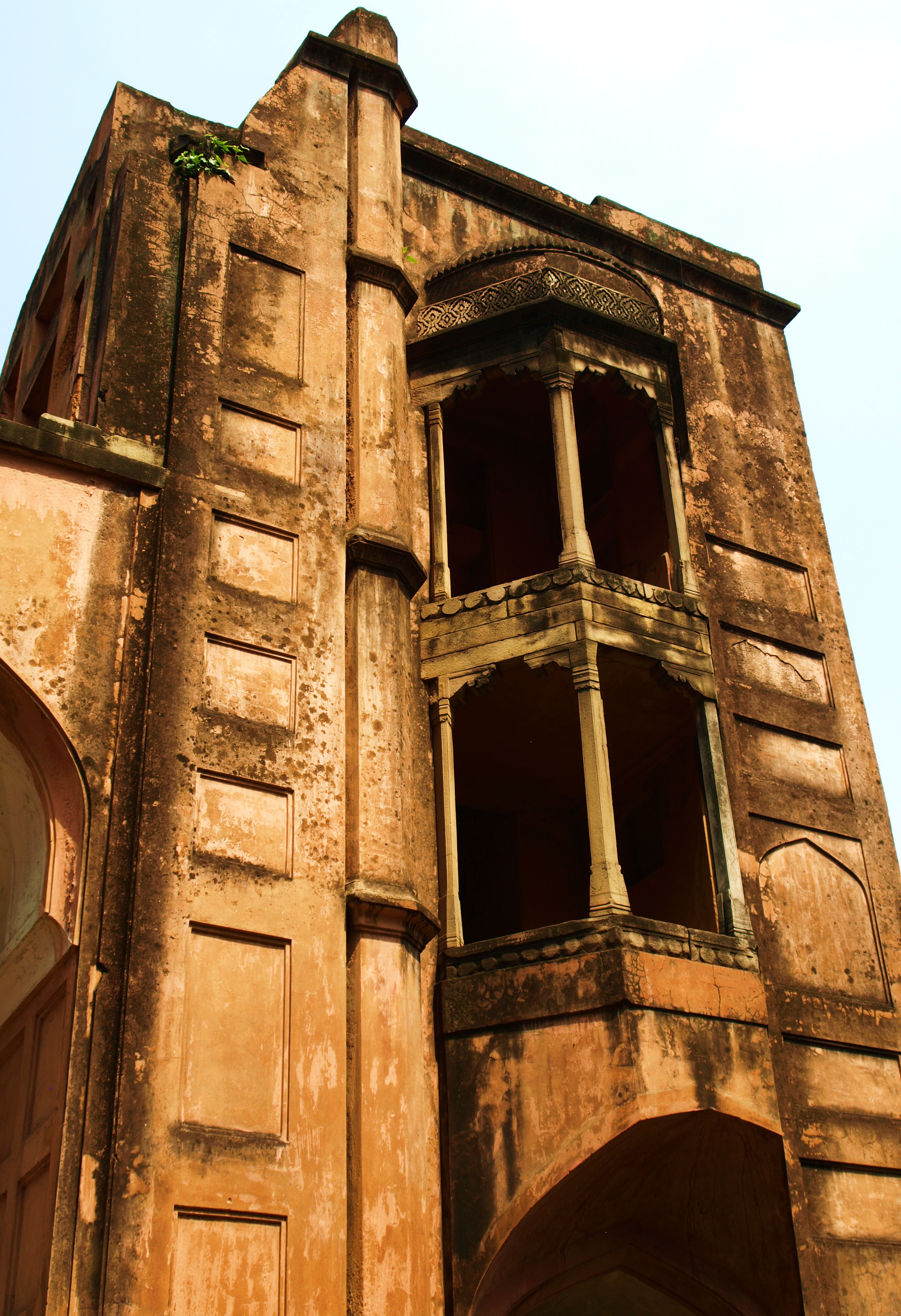
Ruins of Lalbagh Fort

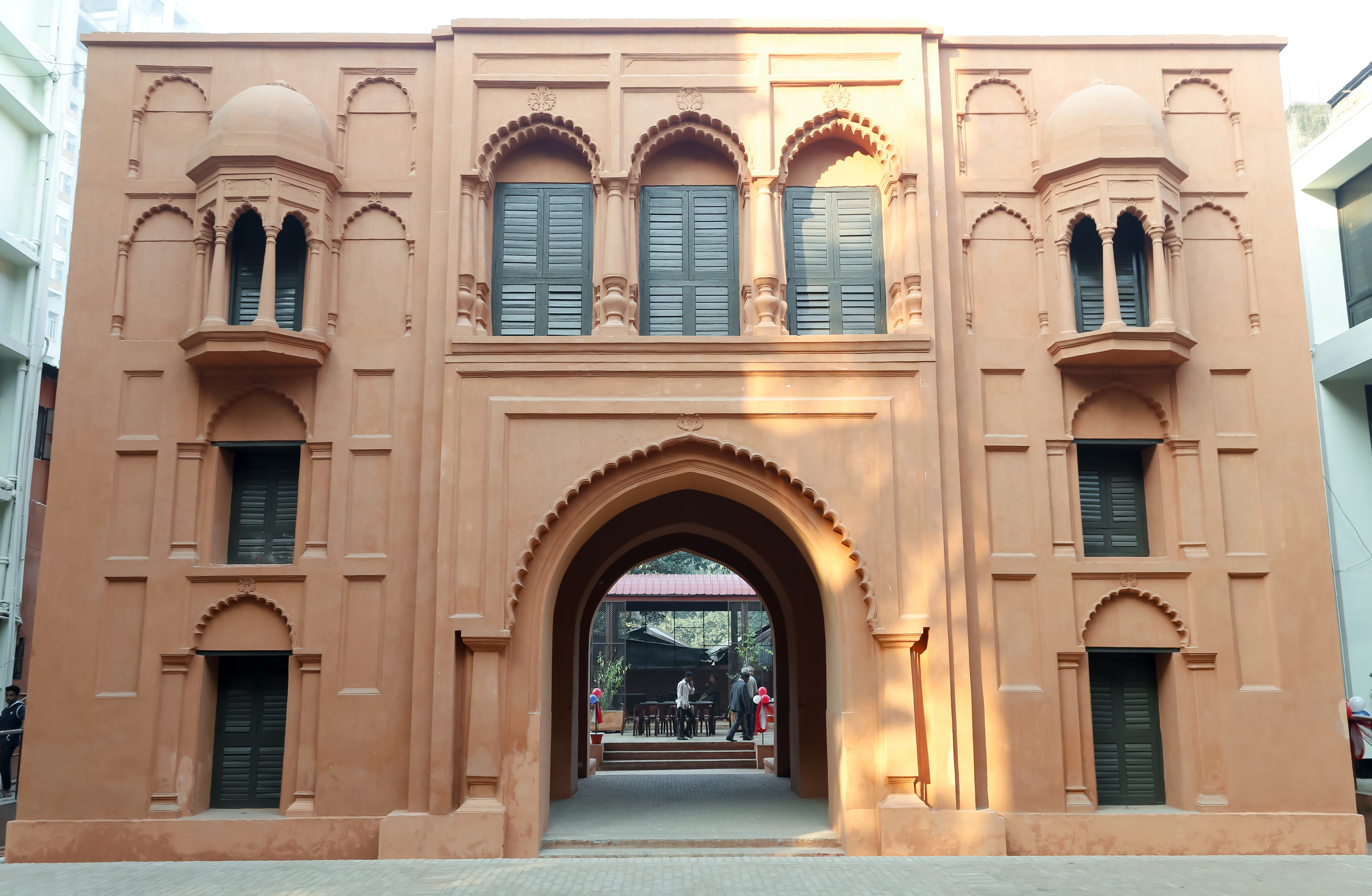
Nimtali arch

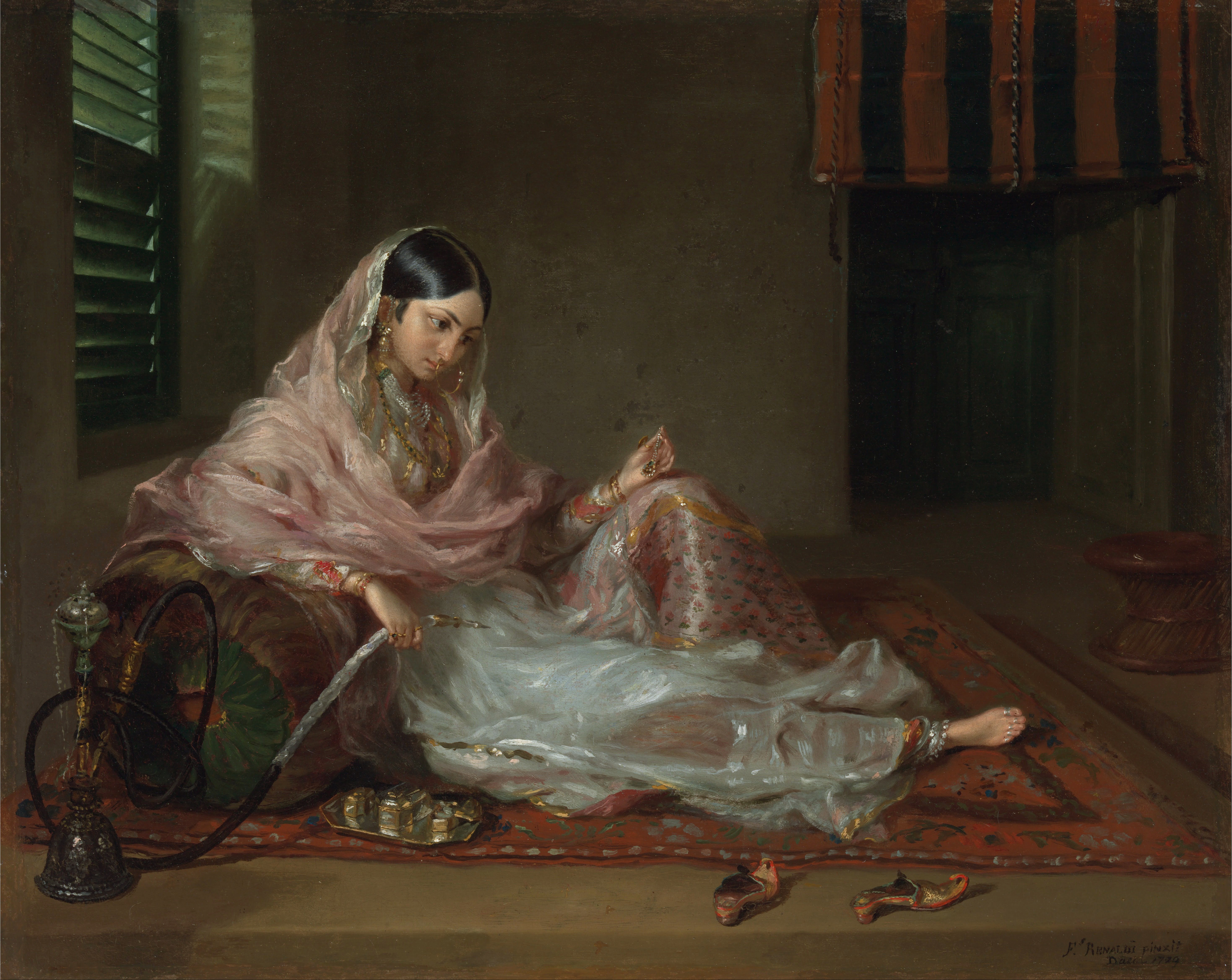
Woman draped in muslin and holding a hookah in Dhaka in 1789

Dhaka became the capital of the Mughal province of Bengal, Bihar, and Orissa in 1610 with a jurisdiction covering modern-day Bangladesh and eastern India, including the modern-day Indian states of West Bengal, Bihar and Orissa. This province was known as Bengal Subah. The city was founded during the reign of Emperor Jahangir. Emperor Shah Jahan visited Dhaka in 1624 and stayed in the city for a week, four years before he became emperor in 1628. Dhaka became one of the richest and greatest cities in the world during the early period of Bengal Subah (1610–1717). The prosperity of Dhaka reached its peak during the administration of governor Shaista Khan (1644–1677 and 1680–1688). Rice was then sold at eight maunds per rupee. Thomas Bowrey, an English merchant sailor who visited the city between 1669 and 1670, wrote that the city was 40 miles in circuit. He estimated the city to be more populated than London with 900,000 people.

Bengal became the economic engine of the Mughal Empire. Dhaka played a key role in the proto-industrialization of Bengal. It was the centre of the muslin trade in Bengal, leading to muslin being called "Daka" in distant markets as far away as Central Asia. Mughal India depended on Bengali products like rice, silk and cotton textiles. European East India Companies from Britain, Holland, France, and Denmark also depended on Bengali products. Bengal accounted for 40% of Dutch imports from Asia, with many products being sold to Dutch ships in Bengali harbours and then transported to Batavia in the Dutch East Indies. Bengal accounted for 50% of textiles and 80% of silks in Dutch textile imports from Asia. Silk was also exported to premodern Japan. The region had a large shipbuilding industry which supplied the Mughal Navy. The shipbuilding output of Bengal during the 16th and 17th centuries stood at 223,250 tons annually, compared to 23,061 tons produced by North America from 1769 to 1771. The Mughals decorated the city with well-laid-out gardens. Caravanserai included the Bara Katra and Choto Katra. The architect of the palatial Bara Katra was Abul Qashim Al Hussaini Attabatayi Assemani. According to inscriptions in the Bangladesh National Museum, the ownership of Bara Katra was entrusted to an Islamic waqf. The Bara Katra also served as a residence for Mughal governors, including Prince Shah Shuja (the son of Mughal Emperor Shah Jahan). Dhaka was home to an array of Mughal bureaucrats and military officials, as well as members of the imperial family. The city was guarded by Mughal artillery like the Bibi Mariam Cannon (Lady Mary Cannon).

Islam Khan I was the first Mughal governor to reside in the city. Khan named it "Jahangirnagar" (The City of Jahangir) in honour of the Emperor Jahangir. The name was dropped soon after the English conquered. The main expansion of the city took place under Governor Shaista Khan. The city then measured 19 by 13 kilometres (11.8 by 8.1 mi), with a population of nearly one million. Dhaka became home to one of the richest elites in Mughal India. The construction of Lalbagh Fort was commenced in 1678 by Prince Azam Shah, who was the governor of Bengal, a son of Emperor Aurangzeb and a future Mughal Emperor himself. The Lalbagh Fort was intended to be the viceregal residence of Mughal governors in eastern India. Before the fort's construction could be completed, the prince was recalled by Emperor Aurangzeb. The fort's construction was halted by Shaista Khan after the death of his daughter Pari Bibi, who is buried in a tomb in the centre of the unfinished fort. Pari Bibi, whose name means Fairy Lady, was legendary for her beauty, engaged to Prince Azam Shah, and a potential future Mughal empress before her premature death. Internal conflict in the Mughal court cut short Dhaka's growth as an imperial city. Prince Azam Shah's rivalry with Murshid Quli Khan resulted in Dhaka losing its status as the provincial capital. In 1717, the provincial capital was shifted to Murshidabad where Murshid Quli Khan declared himself as the Nawab of Bengal.

=== Naib Nizamat ===
Columbo Sahib's Tomb, dating back to 1791, at the Narinda Cemetery. It is an example of an early blend of Mughal and Gothic architecture. The style of the tomb is one of the rarest in South Asia, with only Dhaka and Surat having tombs designed in this style.

Under the Nawabs of Bengal, the Naib Nazim of Dhaka was in charge of the city. The Naib Nazim was the deputy governor of Bengal. He also dealt with the upkeep of the Mughal Navy. The Naib Nazim was in charge of the Dhaka Division, which included Dhaka, Comilla, and Chittagong. Dhaka Division was one of the four divisions under the Nawabs of Bengal. The Nawabs of Bengal allowed European trading companies to establish factories across Bengal. The region then became a hotbed for European rivalries. The British moved to oust the last independent Nawab of Bengal in 1757, who was allied with the French. Due to the defection of Nawab's army chief Mir Jafar to the British side, the last Nawab lost the Battle of Plassey.

After the Battle of Buxar in 1765, the Treaty of Allahabad allowed the British East India Company to become the tax collector in Bengal on behalf of the Mughal Emperor in Delhi. The Naib Nazim continued to function until 1793 when all his powers were transferred to the East India Company. The city formally passed to the control of the East India Company in 1793. British military raids damaged a lot of the city's infrastructure. The military conflict caused a sharp decline in the urban population. Dhaka's fortunes received a boost with connections to the mercantile networks of the British Empire. With the dawn of the Industrial Revolution in Britain, Dhaka became a leading centre of the jute trade, as Bengal accounted for the largest share of the world's jute production. But the British neglected Dhaka's industrial and urban development until the late 19th century. Income from the pre-colonial, proto-industrialized textile industry dried up. Bengali weavers went out of business after the imposition of a 75% tax on the export of cotton from Bengal, as well as the surge in imports of cheap, British-manufactured fabrics after the advent of the spinning mule and steam power. The rapid growth of the colonial capital Calcutta contributed to the decline in Dhaka's population and economy in the early 1800s. In 1824, an Anglican bishop described Dhaka as a "City of magnificent ruins". Evan so, it still had an estimated 90,000 houses and huts and a population of around 300,000 by the 1840s.

=== Trade and migration ===
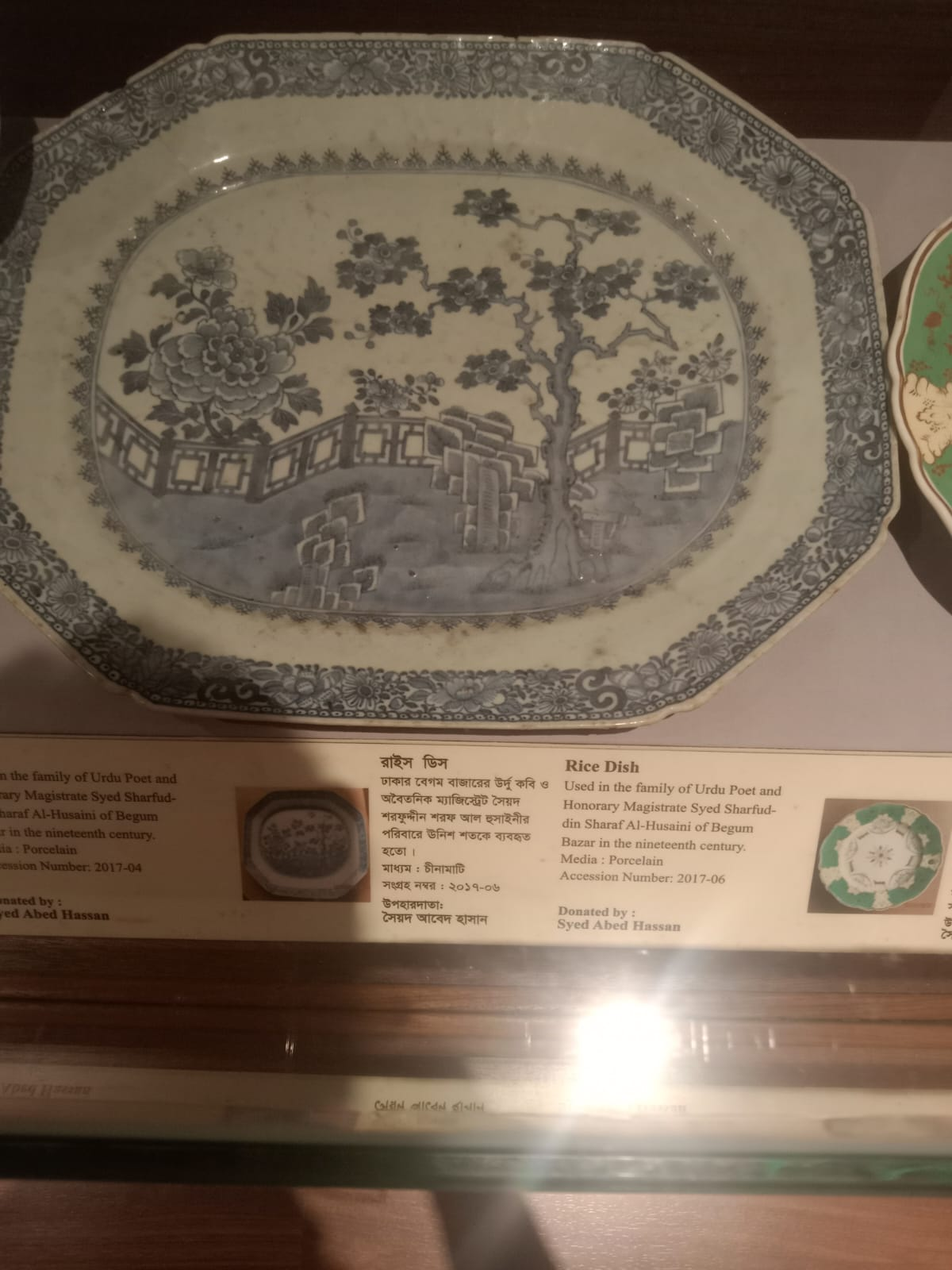
China (porcelain) belonging to a family of Old Dhaka in the 1800s.

Dhaka hosted factories of the English East India Company, the Dutch East India Company, and French East India Company. The property of the Ahsan Manzil was initially bought by the French for their factory and later sold to the Dhaka Nawab Family. The Portuguese were reportedly responsible for introducing cheese. Dhaka saw an influx of migrants during the Mughal Empire. An Armenian community from the Safavid Empire settled in Dhaka and was involved in the city's textile trade, paying a 3.5% tax. The Armenians were very active in the city's social life. They opened the Pogose School. Marwaris were the Hindu trading community. Dhaka also became home to Jews and Greeks. The city has a Greek memorial. Several families of Dhaka's elite spoke Urdu and included Urdu poets. Persians also settled in the city to serve as administrators and military commanders of the Mughal government in Bengal. The legacy of cosmopolitan trading communities lives on in the names of neighbourhoods in Old Dhaka, including Farashganj (French Bazaar), Armanitola (Armenian Quarter) and Postogola (Portuguese Quarter).

According to those who lived in the historic city, "Dhaka was a courtly, genteel town – the very last flowering, in their telling, of Mughal etiquette and sensibility. It is this history that is today still reflected in the faded grandeur of the old city, now crumbling due to decades of neglect. The narrow, winding, high-walled lanes and alleyways, the old high-ceilinged houses with verandas and balconies, the old neighbourhoods, the graveyards and gardens, the mosques, the grand old mansions – these are all still there if one goes looking". Railway stations, postal departments, civil service posts and river port stations were often staffed by Anglo-Indians.

The city's hinterland supplied rice, jute, gunny sacks, turmeric, ginger, leather hides, silk, rugs, saltpeter, salt, sugar, indigo, cotton, and iron. British opium policy in Bengal contributed to the Opium Wars with China. American traders collected artwork, handicrafts, terracotta, sculptures, religious and literary texts, manuscripts, and military weapons from Bengal. Some objects from the region are on display in the Peabody Essex Museum. The increase in international trade led to profits for many families in the city, allowing them to buy imported luxury goods.

=== British Raj ===
During the Indian mutiny of 1857, the city witnessed revolts by the Bengal Army. Direct rule by the British crown was established following the successful quelling of the mutiny. It bestowed privileges on the Dhaka Nawab Family, which dominated the city's political and social elite. The Dhaka Cantonment was established as a base for the British Indian Army. The British developed the modern city around Ramna, Shahbag Garden, and Victoria Park. Dhaka got its own version of the hansom cab as public transport in 1856. The number of carriages increased from 60 in 1867 to 600 in 1889.

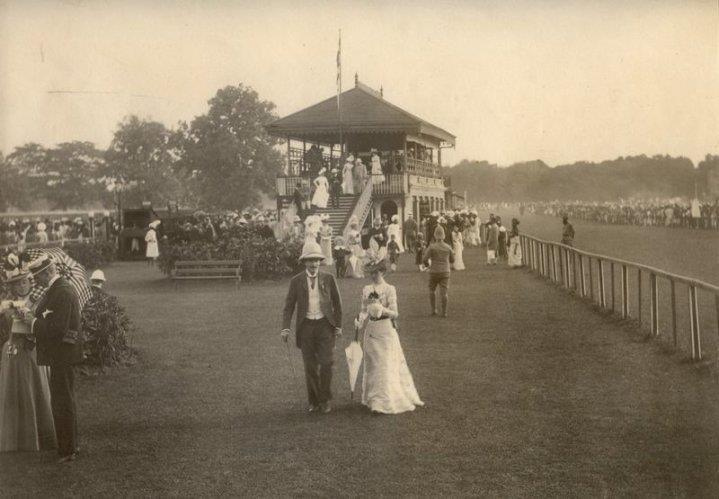
A horse racing derby taking place in Dhaka in 1890.

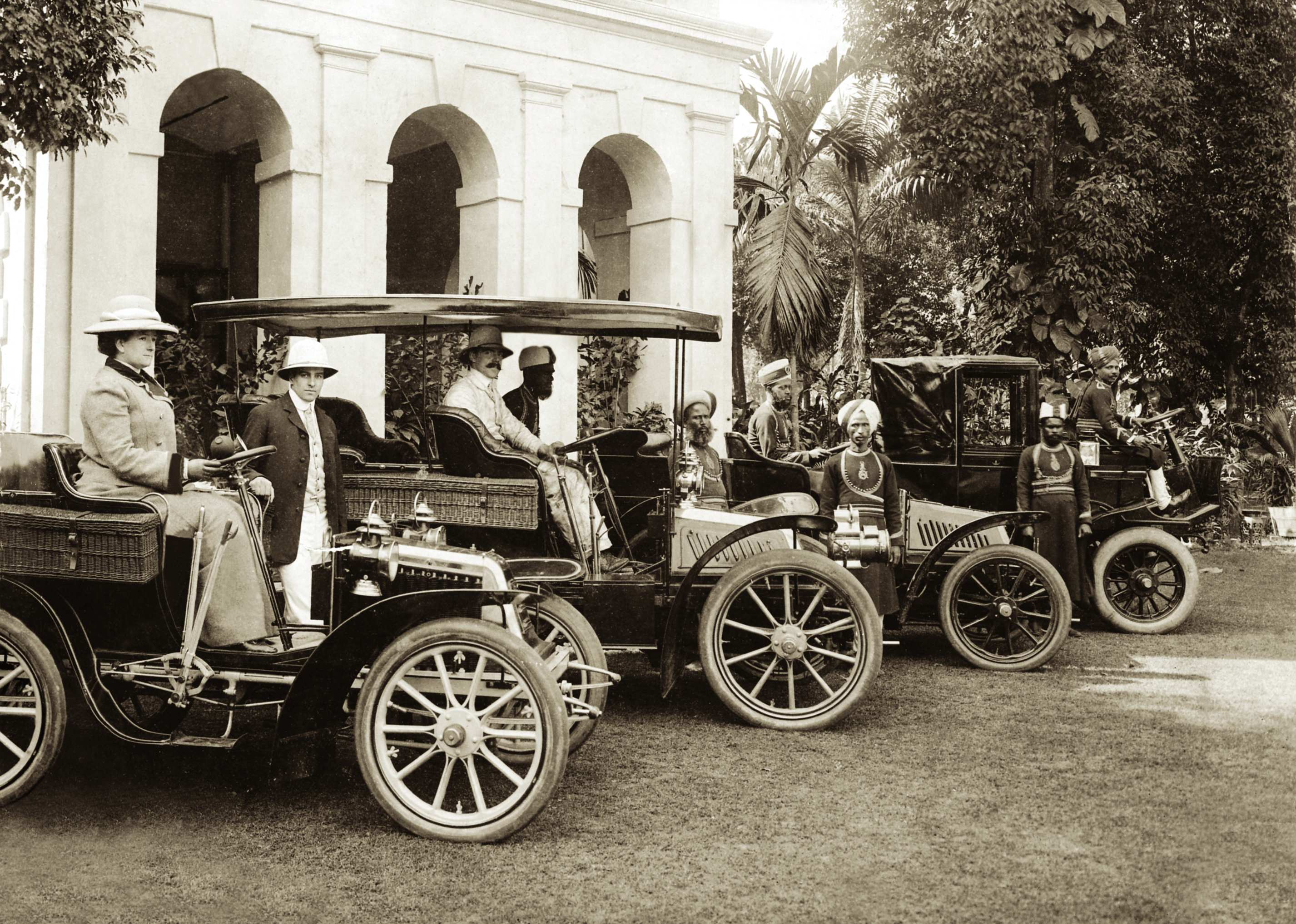
Lord Curzon (standing far left) with early automobiles in Shahbag in 1904

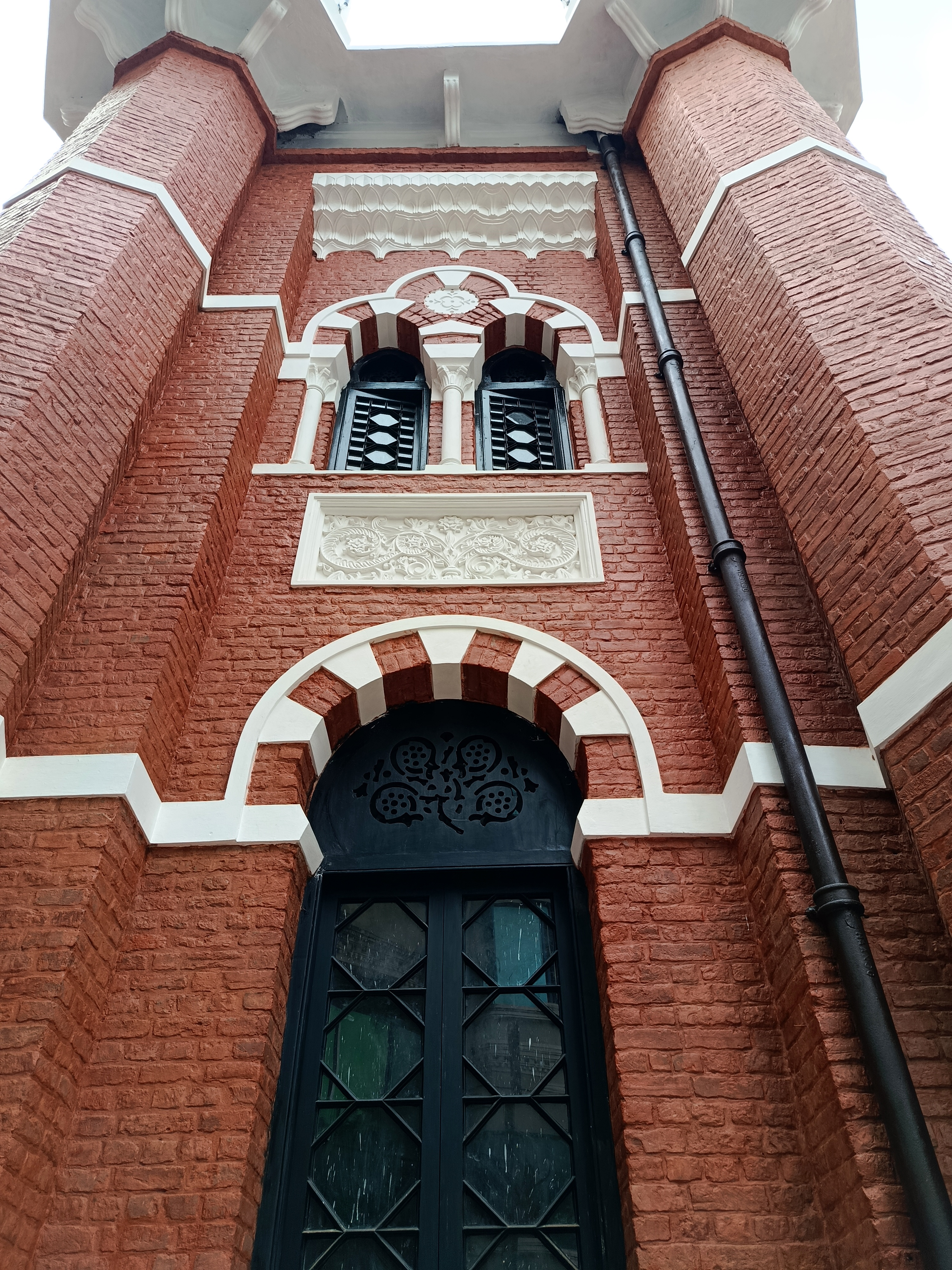
Moorish architectural elements on Northbrook Hall which blends Moorish and Indo-Saracenic styles

A modern civic water system was introduced in 1874. In 1885, the Dhaka State Railway was opened with a 144 km metre gauge (1000 mm) rail line connecting Mymensingh and the Port of Narayanganj through Dhaka. The city later became a hub of the Eastern Bengal State Railway. The first film shown in Dhaka was screened at the riverfront Crown Theatre on 17 April 1898. The film show was organized by the Bedford Bioscope Company. The electricity supply began in 1901.

This period is described as being "the colonial-era part of Dhaka, developed by the British during the early 20th century. Similar to colonial boroughs the length and breadth of the Subcontinent, this development was typified by stately government buildings, spacious tree-lined avenues, and sturdy white-washed bungalows set amidst always overgrown (the British never did manage to fully tame the landscape) gardens. Once upon a time, this was the new city; and even though it is today far from the ritziest part of town, the streets here are still wider and the trees more abundant and the greenery more evident than in any other part".

Some of the early educational institutions established during the period of British rule include the Dhaka College, the Dhaka Medical School, the Eden College, St. Gregory's School, the Mohsinia Madrasa, Jagannath College and the Ahsanullah School of Engineering. Horse racing was a favourite pastime for elite residents in the city's Ramna Race Course beside the Dhaka Club. The Viceroy of India would often dine and entertain with Bengali aristocrats in the city. Automobiles began appearing after the turn of the century. A 1937 Sunbeam-Talbot Ten was preserved in the Liberation War Museum. The Nawabs of Dhaka owned Rolls-Royces. Austin cars were widely used. Beauty Boarding was a popular inn and restaurant.

Dhaka's fortunes changed in the early 20th century. British neglect of Dhaka's urban development was overturned with the first partition of Bengal in 1905, which restored Dhaka's status as a regional capital. The city became the seat of government for Eastern Bengal and Assam, with a jurisdiction covering most of modern-day Bangladesh and all of what is now Northeast India. The partition was the brainchild of Lord Curzon, who finally acted on British ideas for partitioning Bengal to improve administration, education, and business. Dhaka became the seat of the Eastern Bengal and Assam Legislative Council. While Dhaka was the main capital throughout the year, Shillong acted as the summer retreat of the administration. Lieutenant Governors were in charge of the province. They resided in Dhaka. The Lt Governors included Sir Bampfylde Fuller (1905–1906), Sir Lancelot Hare (1906–1911), and Sir Charles Stuart Bayley (1911–1912). Their legacy lives on in the names of three major thoroughfares in modern Dhaka, including Hare Road, Bayley Road, and Fuller Road. The period saw the construction of stately buildings, including the High Court and Curzon Hall.

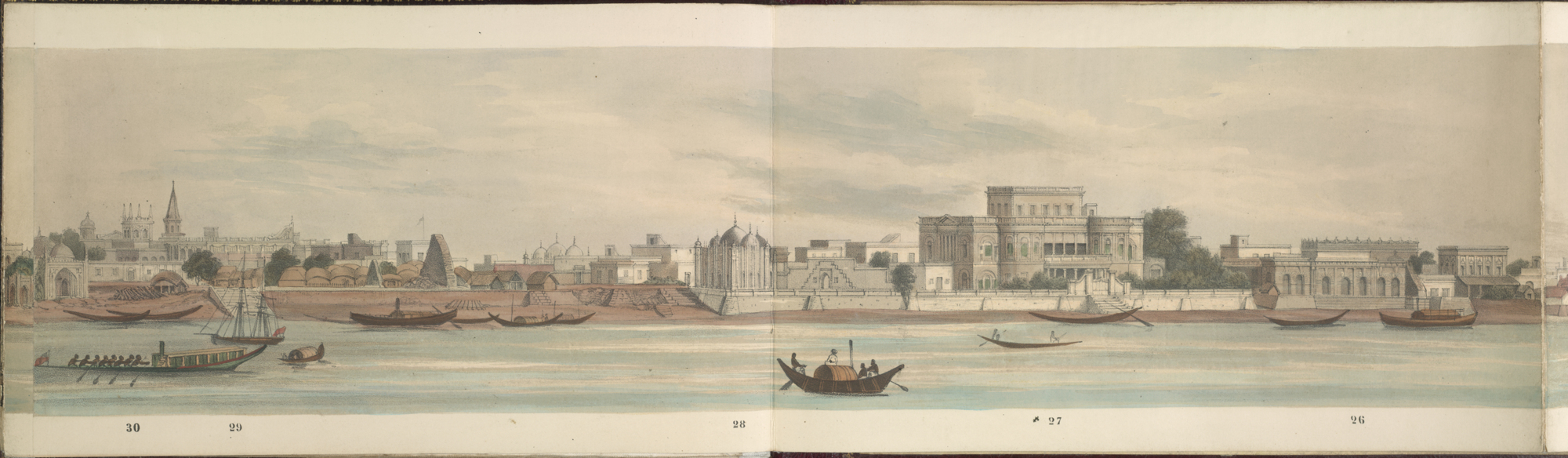
Panorama of the Dhaka waterfront in 1847

Dhaka was the seat of government for 4 administrative divisions, including the Assam Valley Division, Chittagong Division, Dacca Division, Rajshahi Division, and the Surma Valley Division. There were a total of 30 districts in Eastern Bengal and Assam, including Dacca, Mymensingh, Faridpur and Backergunge in Dacca Division; Tippera, Noakhali, Chittagong and the Hill Tracts in Chittagong Division; Rajshahi, Dinajpur, Jalpaiguri, Rangpur, Bogra, Pabna and Malda in Rajshahi Division; Sylhet, Cachar, the Khasi and Jaintia Hills, the Naga Hills and the Lushai Hills in Surma Valley Division; and Goalpara, Kamrup, the Garo Hills, Darrang, Nowgong, Sibsagar and Lakhimpur in Assam Valley Division. The province was bordered by Cooch Behar State, Hill Tipperah and the Kingdom of Bhutan.

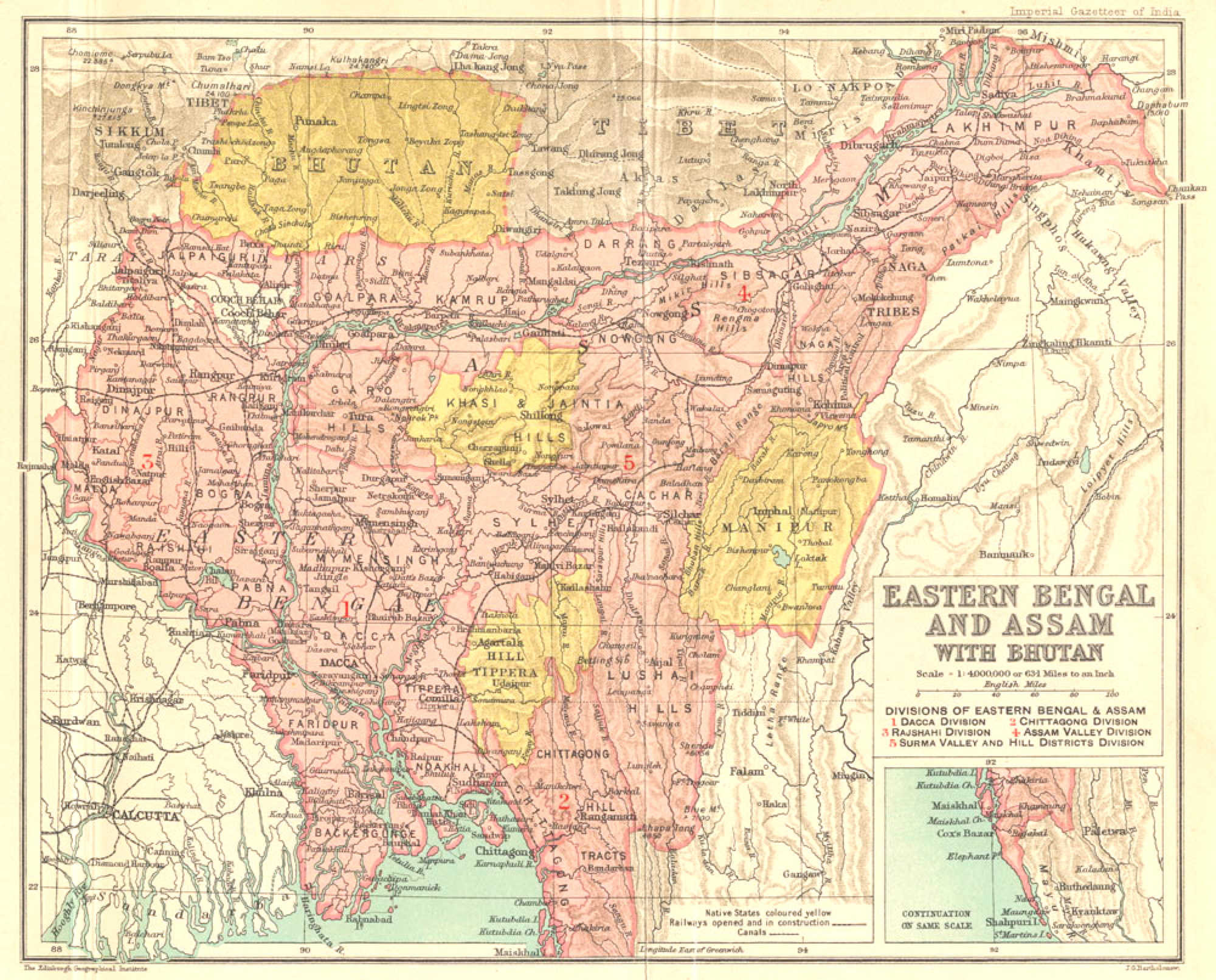
Dhaka was the capital of Eastern Bengal and Assam in the British Raj between 1905 and 1912

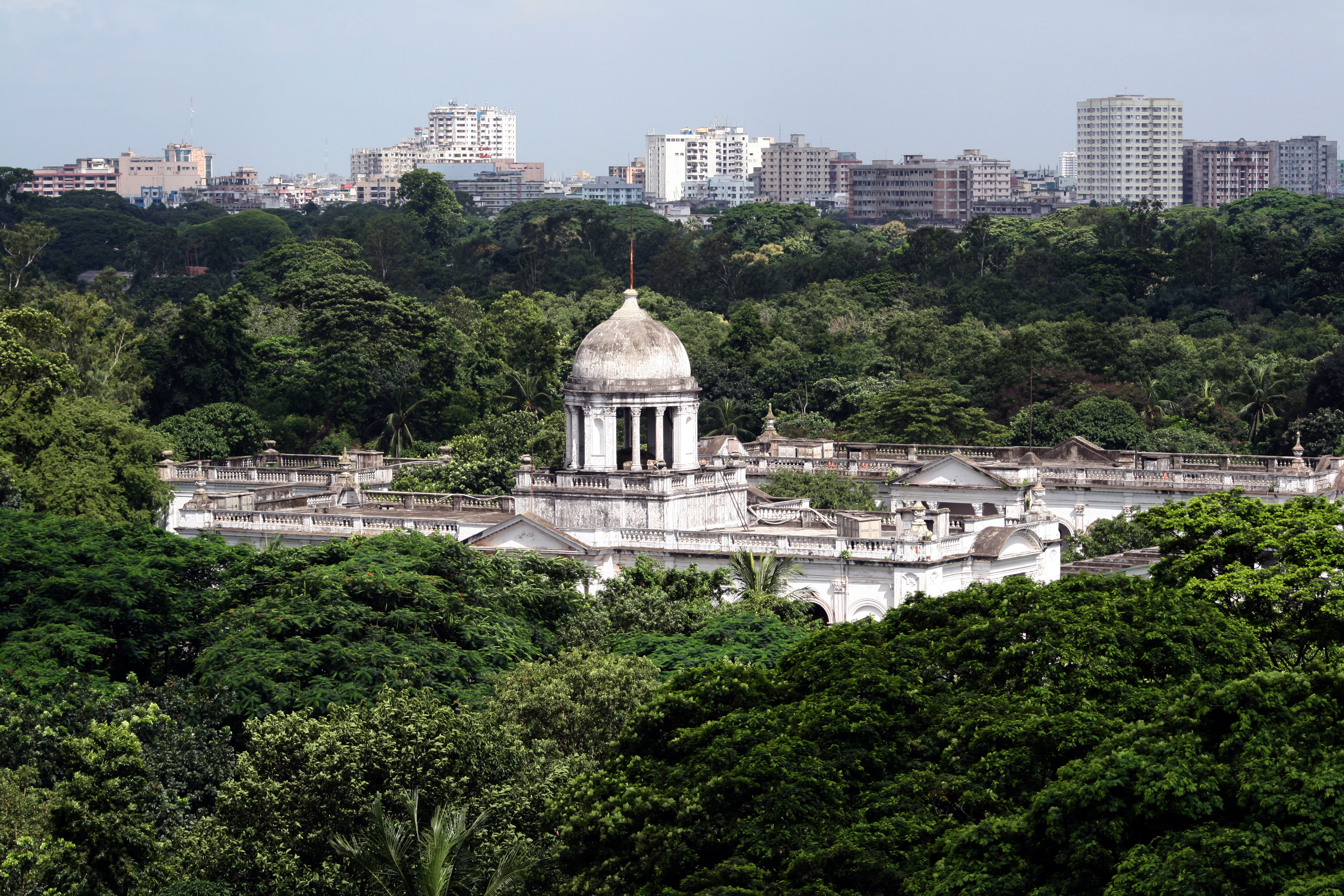
Old High Court Building, Dhaka

On the political front, partition allowed Dhaka to project itself as the standard-bearer of Muslim communities in British India, as opposed to the heavily Hindu-dominated city of Calcutta. In 1906, the All India Muslim League was founded in the city during a conference on liberal education hosted by the Nawab of Dhaka and the Aga Khan III. The Muslim population in Dhaka and eastern Bengal generally favoured partition in the hopes of getting better jobs and educational opportunities. Many Bengalis, however, opposed the bifurcation of the ethnolinguistic region. The partition was annulled by an announcement from King George V during the Delhi Durbar in 1911. The British decided to reunite Bengal while the capital of India was shifted to New Delhi from Calcutta.

As a "splendid compensation" for the annulment of partition, the British gave the city a newly formed university in the 1920s. The University of Dhaka was initially modelled on the residential style of the University of Oxford. It became known as the Oxford of the East because of its residential character. Like Oxford, students in Dhaka were affiliated with their halls of residence instead of their academic departments (this system was dropped after 1947 and students are now affiliated with academic departments). The university's faculty included scientist Satyendra Nath Bose (who is the namesake of the Higgs boson); linguist Muhammad Shahidullah, Sir A F Rahman (the first Bengali vice-chancellor of the university); and historian R. C. Majumdar. The university was established in 1921 by the Imperial Legislative Council. It started with three faculties and 12 departments, covering the subjects of Sanskrit, Bengali, English, liberal arts, history, Arabic, Islamic Studies, Persian, Urdu, philosophy, economics, politics, physics, chemistry, mathematics, and law.

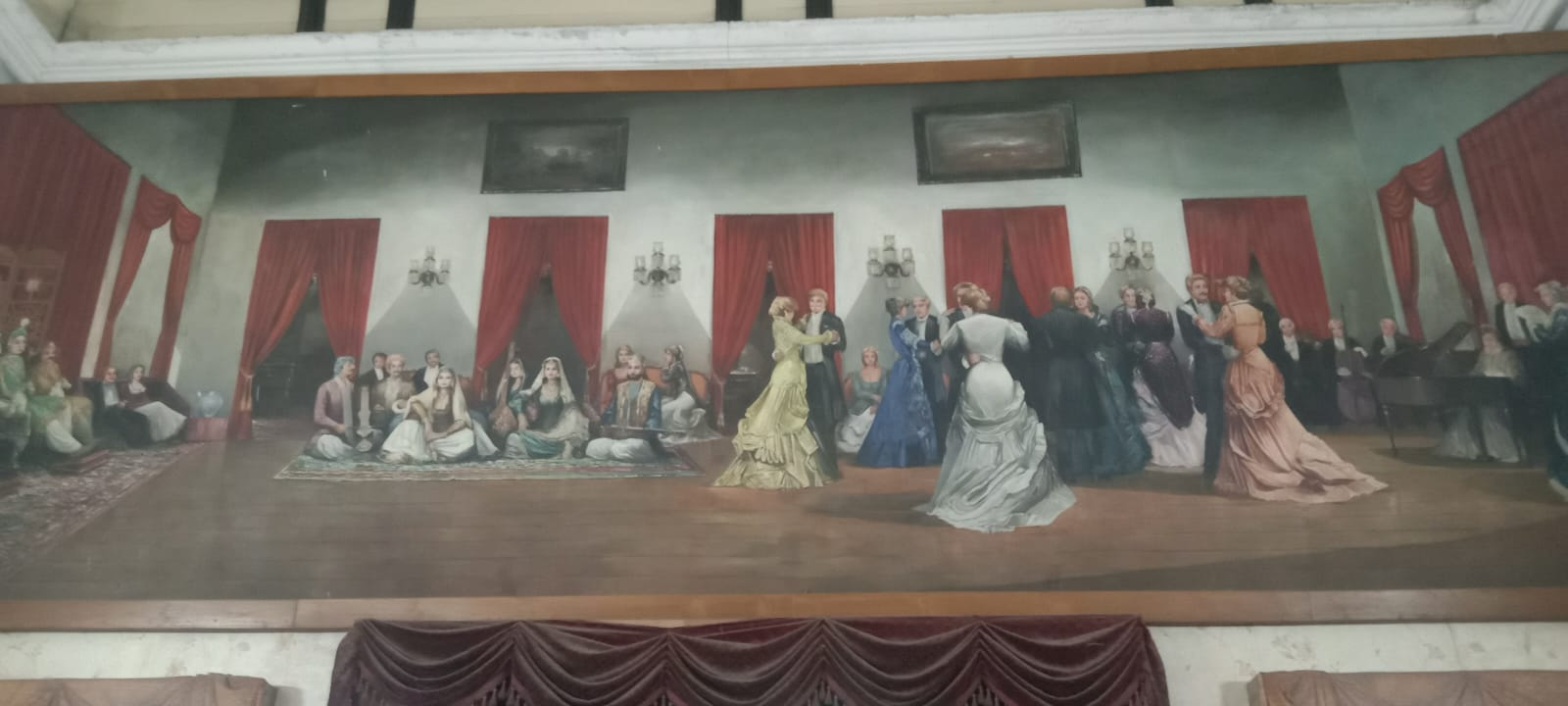
An evening of ballroom dancing with Hindustani classical music hosted by the Nawab of Dhaka on the first floor of Ahsan Manzil

The East Bengal Cinematograph Company produced the first full-length silent movies in Dhaka during the 1920s, including Sukumari and The Last Kiss. DEVCO, a subsidiary of the Occtavian Steel Company, began widescale power distribution in 1930. The Tejgaon Airport was constructed during World War II as a base for Allied Forces. The Dhaka Medical College was established in 1946.

The city's influential Armenian community included merchants and landowners. Armenian zamindars built many buildings, including the Armenian Church. Dhaka's hinterland was controlled by the Zamindars of Bengal, including the Urdu-speaking Dhaka Nawab Estate, the Bengali Hindu Bhawal Estate, and the Bengali Muslim Dhanbari Estate. Although Dhaka had been a Muslim majority city with a large Hindu minority up until the 1800s, its Hindu population increased markedly in the later half of the 19th century such that by time of the 1872 census, a plurality of the population in the city was Hindu. By the 1881 census, Hindus formed a majority of the population of Dhaka. The new Hindu elites largely controlled the city's economy and sought greater influence in the city's governance, beginning from the first municipal election in 1885. Hindus were engaged in professions like teaching, medicine, law, and business. The future Nobel laureate Amartya Sen spent part of his childhood in Dhaka. Jogesh Chandra Ghosh, the pioneer of modern Ayurvedic medicine, opened his first factory in Dhaka.

At the time of the partition of India in 1947, 58.5% of Dhaka's population consisted of Hindus. A vast majority of the city's buildings and markets were owned by Hindus, with one estimate suggesting that 85% of all immovable property in Dhaka was owned by Hindus in 1947. Muslims deeply resented the growth of Hindu influence under British rule. Dhaka saw an exodus of its Hindu population after the partition, with most relocating to West Bengal. Middle class and affluent Hindus were compelled to leave due to uncertain future, communal unrests and adverse government policies. Many Hindus abandoned their properties out of fear of violence, others were dispossessed of their properties by the government often without compensation. These properties were appropriated for administrative use or were forcibly occupied by incoming Muslim refugees or transferred to them. The properties were seized by the state under laws which eventually became known as the Vested Property Act. More Hindus fled the city following state-sponsored anti-Hindu riots in 1950. According to the 1951 Census of Pakistan, the first to be held after partition, only 11.7% of Dhaka’s population was Hindu.

=== Metropolitan Dhaka ===
NASA animation showing the urban growth of Dhaka from 1972 to 2001.

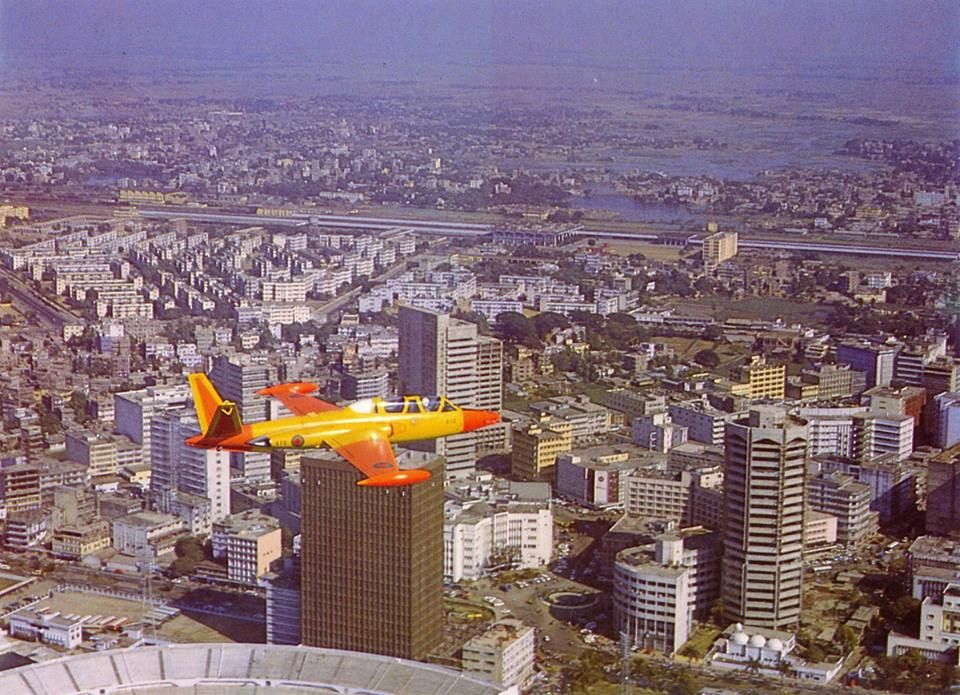
Aerial view of Dhaka's main CBD in the 1980s

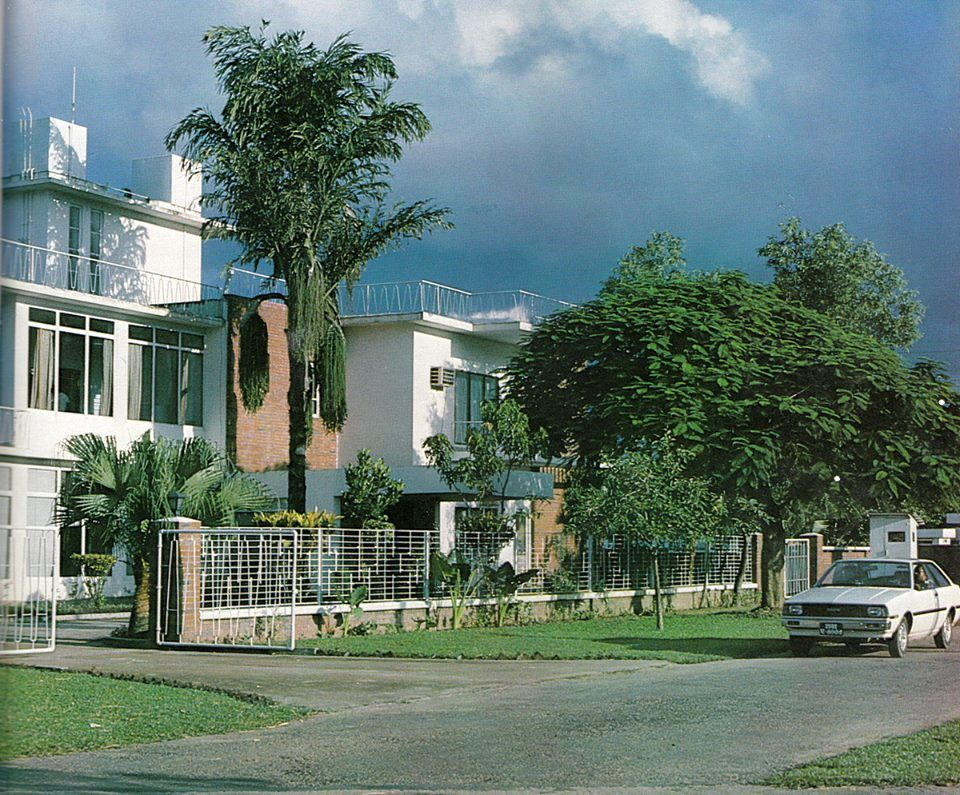
A suburban residential neighbourhood in the 1980s

The development of the "real city" began after the partition of India. After partition, Dhaka became known as the second capital of Pakistan. This was formalized in 1962 when Ayub Khan declared the city as the legislative capital under the 1962 constitution. New neighbourhoods began to spring up in formerly barren and agrarian areas. These included Dhanmondi (rice granary), Katabon (thorn forest), Kathalbagan (jackfruit garden), Kalabagan (banana garden), Segunbagicha (teak garden) and Gulshan (flower garden). Living standards rapidly improved from the pre-partition standards. The economy began to industrialize. On the outskirts of the city, the world's largest jute mill was built. The mill produced jute goods which were in high demand during the Korean War. People began building duplex houses. In 1961, Queen Elizabeth II and Prince Philip witnessed the improved living standards of Dhaka's residents. The Intercontinental hotel, designed by William B. Tabler, was opened in 1966. Estonian-American architect Louis I. Kahn was enlisted to design the Dhaka Assembly, which was originally intended to be the federal parliament of Pakistan and later became independent Bangladesh's parliament. The East Pakistan Helicopter Service connected the city to regional towns.

The Dhaka Stock Exchange was opened on 28 April 1954. The first local airline Orient Airways began flights between Dhaka and Karachi on 6 June 1954. The Dhaka Improvement Trust was established in 1956 to coordinate the city's development. The first master plan for the city was drawn up in 1959. The Southeast Asia Treaty Organization established a medical research centre (now called ICDDR,B) in the city in 1960.

The early period of political turbulence was seen between 1947 and 1952, particularly the Bengali language movement. From the mid-1960s, the Awami League's 6-point autonomy demands began giving rise to pro-independence aspirations across East Pakistan. In 1969, Sheikh Mujibur Rahman was released from prison amid a mass upsurge which led to the resignation of Ayub Khan in 1970. The city had an influential press with prominent newspapers like the Pakistan Observer, Ittefaq, Forum, and the Weekly Holiday. During the political and constitutional crisis in 1971, the military junta led by Yahya Khan refused to transfer power to the newly elected National Assembly, causing mass riots, civil disobedience, and a movement for self-determination. On 7 March 1971, Awami League leader Sheikh Mujibur Rahman addressed a massive public gathering at the Ramna Race Course Maidan in Dhaka, in which he warned of an independence struggle. Subsequently, East Pakistan came under a non-co-operation movement against the Pakistani state. On Pakistan's Republic Day (23 March 1971), Bangladeshi flags were hoisted throughout Dhaka in a show of resistance.

On 25 March 1971, the Pakistan Army launched military operations under Operation Searchlight against the population of East Pakistan. Dhaka bore the brunt of the army's atrocities, witnessing a genocide and a campaign of wide-scale repression, with the arrest, torture, and murder of the city's civilians, students, intelligentsia, political activists and religious minorities. The army faced mutinies from the East Pakistan Rifles and the Bengali police. Large parts of the city were burnt and destroyed, including Hindu neighbourhoods. Much of the city's population was either displaced or forced to flee to the countryside. Dhaka was struck with numerous air raids by the Indian Air Force in December. The Pakistan Eastern Command surrendered to Lt. Gen. Jagjit Singh Aurora at the Ramna Race Course in Dhaka on 16 December 1971.

After independence, Dhaka's population grew from several hundred thousand to several million in five decades. Dhaka was declared the national capital by the Constituent Assembly of Bangladesh in 1972. The post-independence period witnessed rapid growth as Dhaka attracted migrant workers from across rural Bangladesh. 60% of population growth has been due to rural migration. The city endured socialist unrest in the early 1970s, followed by a few years of martial law. The stock exchange and free market were restored in the late 1970s. In the 1980s, Dhaka saw the inauguration of the National Parliament House (which won the Aga Khan Award for Architecture), a new international airport and the Bangladesh National Museum. Bangladesh pioneered the formation of the South Asian Association for Regional Cooperation (SAARC) and hosted its first summit in Dhaka in 1985. A mass uprising in 1990 led to the return of parliamentary democracy. Dhaka hosted a trilateral summit between India, Pakistan, and Bangladesh in 1998; the summit of the D-8 Organization for Economic Cooperation in 1999 and conferences of the Commonwealth, SAARC, the OIC and United Nations agencies during various years.

In the 1990s and 2000s, Dhaka experienced improved economic growth and the emergence of affluent business districts and satellite towns. Between 1990 and 2005, the city's population doubled from 6 million to 12 million. There has been increased foreign investment in the city, particularly in the financial and textile manufacturing sectors. Between 2008 and 2011, the government of Bangladesh organized three years of celebrations to mark 400 years since Dhaka's founding as an early modern city. But frequent hartals by political parties have greatly hampered the city's economy. The hartal rate has declined since 2014. In some years, the city experienced a widespread flash flood during the monsoon.

In 2010s, Dhaka emerged as one of the fastest-growing megacities in the world. Most of its population are rural migrants, including climate refugees. However, nearly one third of Dhaka's population lives in slums, as of 2016. Congestion is one of the most prominent features of modern Dhaka. In 2014, it was reported that only 7% of the city was covered by roads. The city's main river, the Buriganga River, has become one of the most polluted rivers in the country. The first phase of Dhaka Metro Rail from Uttara to Agargaon was inaugurated by Prime Minister Sheikh Hasina on 28 December 2022.

== Geography ==
=== Topography ===
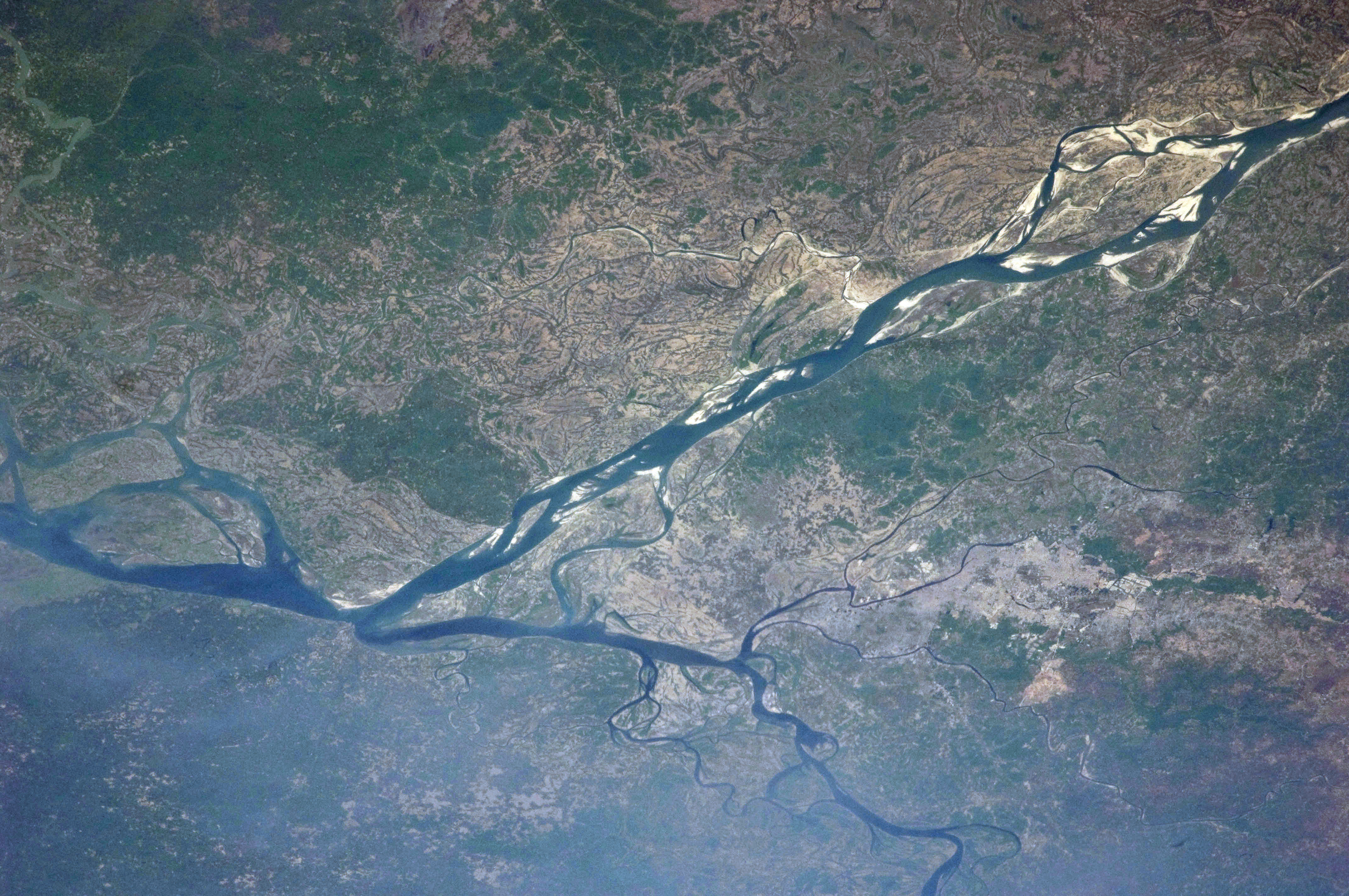
View of Dhaka from the International Space Station

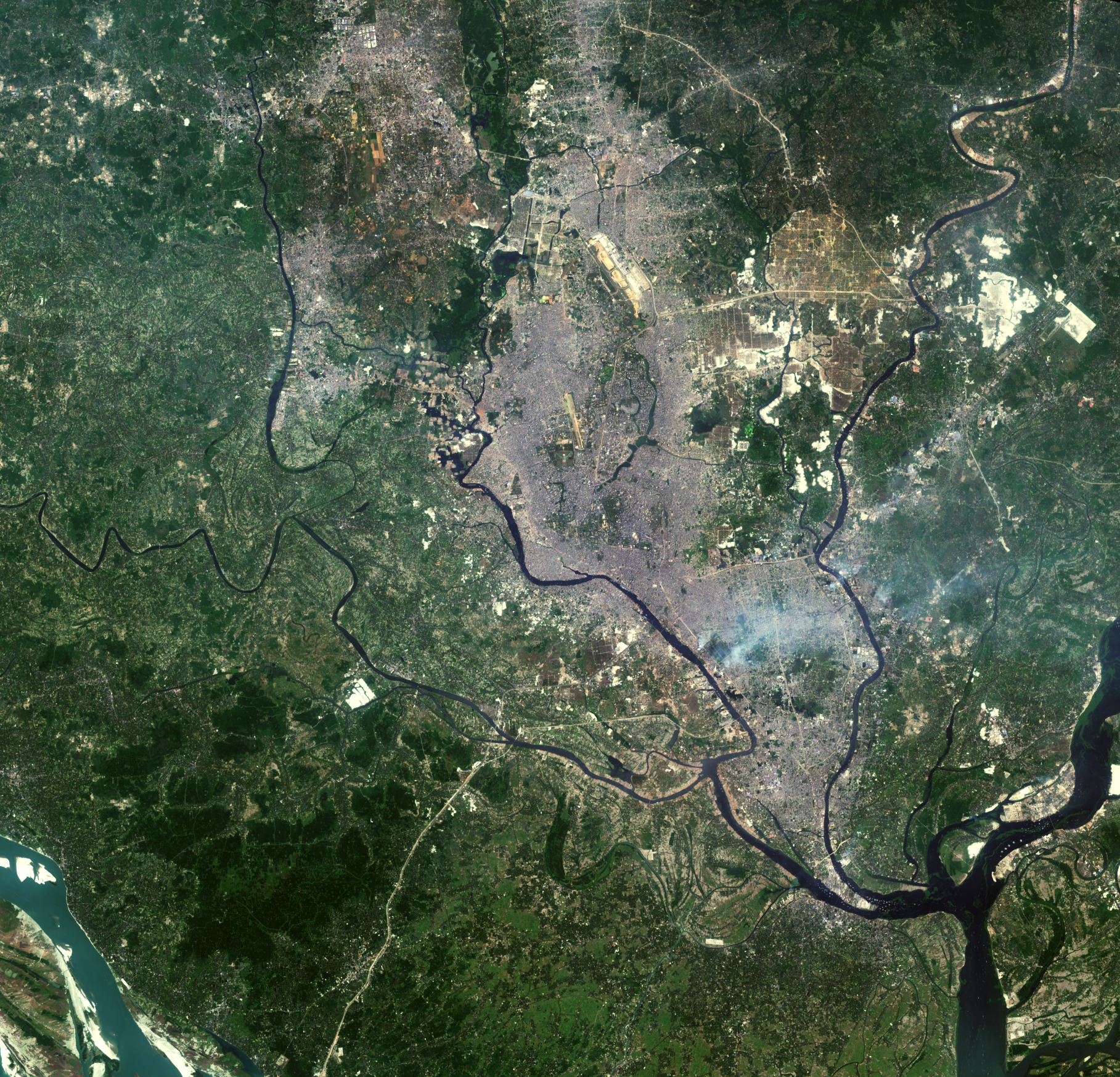
Satellite view of Greater Dhaka metropolitan area

Dhaka is located in central Bangladesh at 23°42′N 90°22′E, on the eastern banks of the Buriganga River. The city lies on the lower reaches of the Ganges Delta and covers a total area of 270 square kilometres (100 sq mi). Tropical vegetation and moist soils characterize the land, which is flat and close to sea level. This leaves Dhaka susceptible to flooding during the monsoon seasons owing to heavy rainfall and cyclones. Due to its location on the lowland plain of the Ganges Delta, the city is fringed by extensive mangroves and tidal flat ecosystems. Dhaka District is bounded by the districts of Gazipur, Tangail, Munshiganj, Rajbari, Narayanganj, and Manikganj.

The city of Dhaka is built over a network of rivers. The city’s life is strongly intertwined with the rivers, as they are used for multiple purposes, including transportation.

=== Cityscape ===
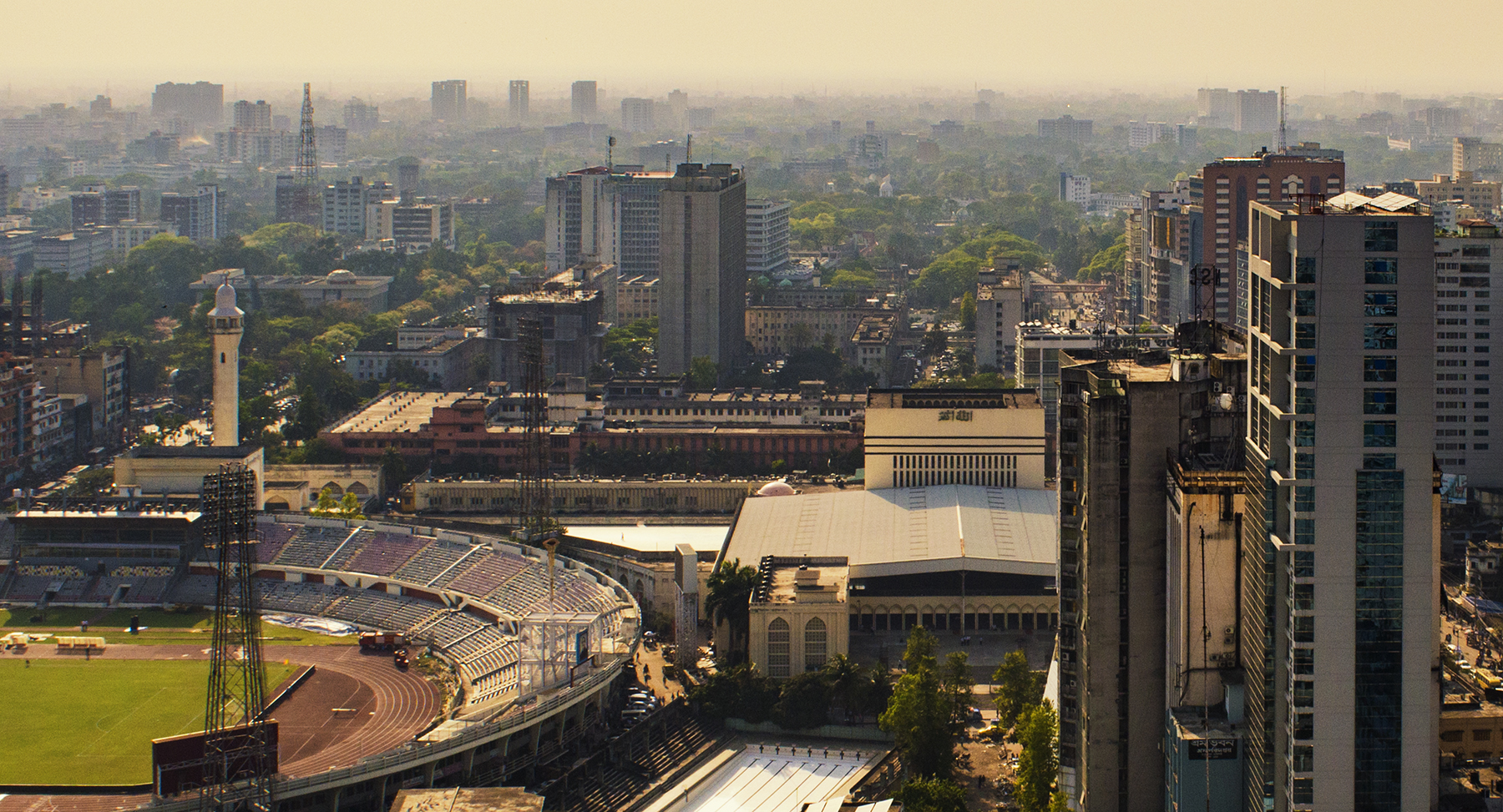
Cityscape of Gulistan

Except Old Dhaka, which is an old bazaar-style neighbourhood, the layout of the city follows a grid pattern with organic development influenced by traditional South Asian as well as Middle Eastern and Western patterns. Growth of the city is largely unplanned and is focused on the northern regions and around the city centre, where many of the more affluent neighbourhoods may be found. Most of the construction in the city consists of concrete high-rise buildings. Middle-class and upper-class housing, along with commercial and industrial areas, occupy most of the city. However, nearly one third of Dhaka's population lives in slums, as of 2016 (see below).

Dhaka does not have a well-defined central business district. Old Dhaka is the historic commercial centre, but most development has moved to the north. In 1985, the area around Motijheel was considered the "modern" CBD, while by 2005 Gulshan was considered the "newest" part of the CBD. Many Bangladeshi government institutions can be found in Motijheel, Segunbagicha, Tejgaon, Karwan Bazar, and Sher-e-Bangla Nagar.

Much activity is centred around a few large roads, where road laws are rarely obeyed and street vendors and beggars are frequently encountered.

For much of recent history, Dhaka was characterized by roadside markets and small shops that sold a wide variety of goods. Recent years have seen the widespread construction of shopping malls. Three of the largest shopping malls in the city and the wider South Asian region are the Jamuna Future Park, Centrepoint and Bashundhara City.

=== Climate ===
Under the Köppen climate classification, Dhaka has a tropical savanna climate (Köppen Aw). The city has a distinct monsoonal season, with an annual average temperature of 26 °C (79 °F) and monthly means varying between 19 °C (66 °F) in January and 29 °C (84 °F) in May. Approximately 87% of the average annual rainfall of 2,123 millimetres (83.6 inches) occurs between May and October.

According to the World Air Quality Report 2024, Dhaka is one of the world's 20 most polluted cities.

Climate data for Dhaka (1991–2020 normals, extremes 1949–present)
Month	Jan	Feb	Mar	Apr	May	Jun	Jul	Aug	Sep	Oct	Nov	Dec	Year
Record high °C (°F)	31.3 (88.3)	35.9 (96.6)	40.6 (105.1)	42.3 (108.1)	41.1 (106.0)	38.7 (101.7)	38.0 (100.4)	37.5 (99.5)	37.8 (100.0)	37.4 (99.3)	34.5 (94.1)	33.0 (91.4)	42.3 (108.1)
Mean daily maximum °C (°F)	24.6 (76.3)	28.3 (82.9)	32.4 (90.3)	33.9 (93.0)	33.6 (92.5)	32.8 (91.0)	32.1 (89.8)	32.3 (90.1)	32.4 (90.3)	31.9 (89.4)	29.7 (85.5)	26.1 (79.0)	30.8 (87.4)
Daily mean °C (°F)	18.4 (65.1)	22.1 (71.8)	26.4 (79.5)	28.6 (83.5)	28.9 (84.0)	29.1 (84.4)	28.9 (84.0)	29.0 (84.2)	28.7 (83.7)	27.5 (81.5)	24.0 (75.2)	19.9 (67.8)	26.0 (78.8)
Mean daily minimum °C (°F)	13.3 (55.9)	16.6 (61.9)	21.1 (70.0)	24.0 (75.2)	24.9 (76.8)	26.3 (79.3)	26.4 (79.5)	26.5 (79.7)	26.0 (78.8)	24.1 (75.4)	19.5 (67.1)	15.2 (59.4)	22.0 (71.6)
Record low °C (°F)	5.6 (42.1)	6.7 (44.1)	10.6 (51.1)	16.6 (61.9)	20.1 (68.2)	21.5 (70.7)	21.1 (70.0)	21.7 (71.1)	21.1 (70.0)	17.2 (63.0)	10.6 (51.1)	7.2 (45.0)	5.6 (42.1)
Average precipitation mm (inches)	7 (0.3)	21 (0.8)	48 (1.9)	128 (5.0)	272 (10.7)	317 (12.5)	391 (15.4)	315 (12.4)	285 (11.2)	174 (6.9)	21 (0.8)	11 (0.4)	1,990 (78.3)
Average precipitation days (≥ 1 mm)	1	2	4	8	14	17	21	21	17	10	2	1	118
Average relative humidity (%)	71	64	62	71	76	82	83	82	83	78	73	73	75
Mean monthly sunshine hours	190.9	207.0	237.3	223.8	206.9	145.2	140.4	143.9	142.6	192.2	206.5	186.9	2,223.6
Mean daily sunshine hours	7.6	7.5	10.1	11	10.4	9	7.5	8.1	8.2	7.9	7.3	7.4	8.5
Percentage possible sunshine	57	65	64	59	50	36	34	36	39	53	63	56	50
Average ultraviolet index	6	8	10	11.5	11.5	11.5	11.5	11.5	11	9	7	6	9
Source 1: NOAA, Bangladesh Meteorological Department (humidity 1981–2010) hours
Source 2: Sistema de Clasificación Bioclimática Mundial (extremes 1934–1994)

=== Parks and greenery ===
Justice Shahabuddin Ahmed Park in Gulshan

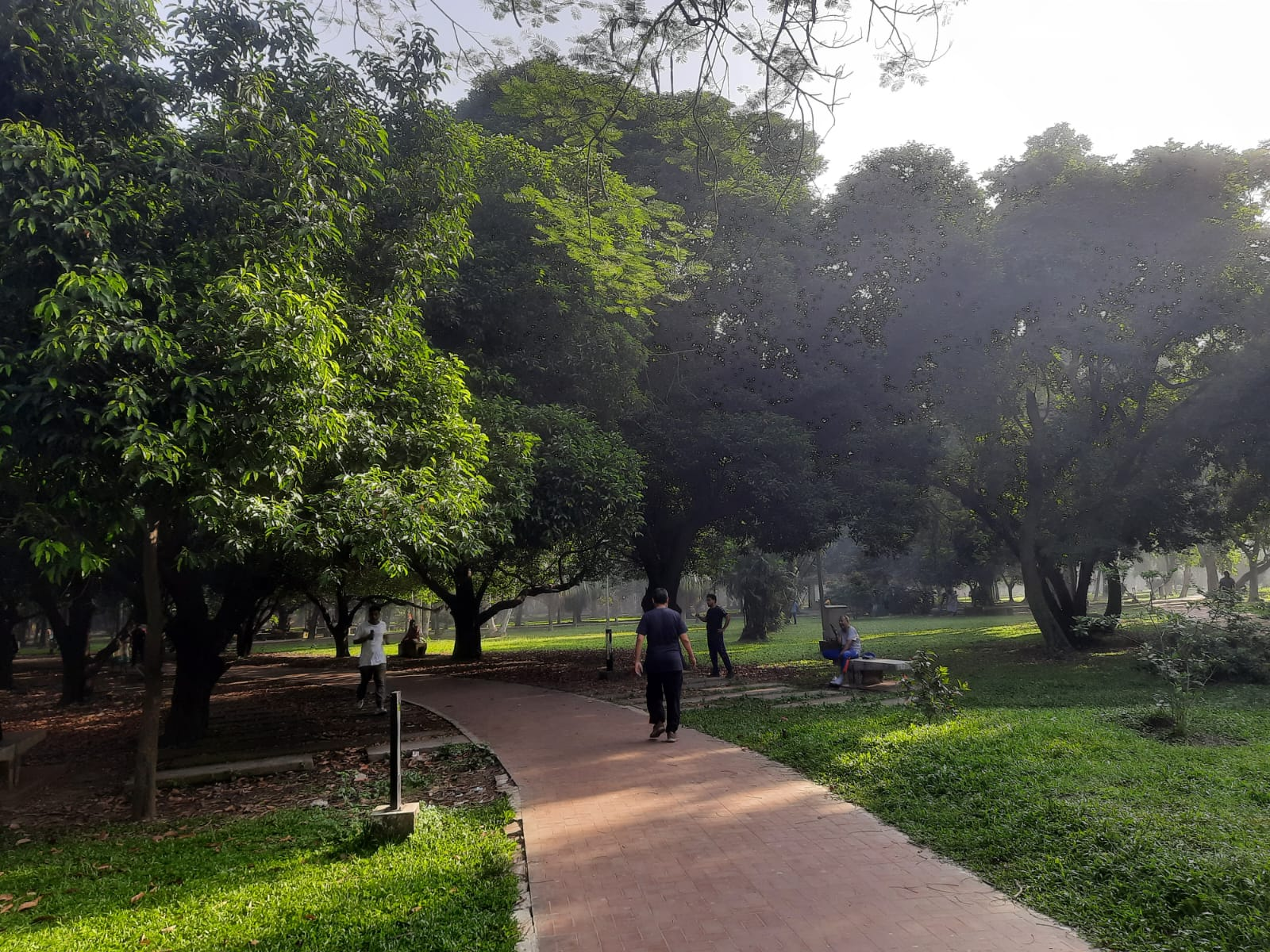
Ramna Park is the largest park in the city

There are many parks within Dhaka City, including Ramna Park, Suhrawardy Udyan, Shishu Park, National Botanical Garden, Baldha Garden, Chandrima Uddan, Gulshan Park and Dhaka Zoo.

=== Rivers and lakes ===
Almost 10% of the city's area consists of water, with 676 ponds and 43 canals. The Buriganga River flows past the southwest outskirts of Dhaka. Its average depth is 7.6 metres (25 ft) and its maximum depth is 18 metres (58 ft). It ranks among the most polluted rivers in the country.

The city is surrounded by six interconnected river systems—the Buriganga and Dhaleshwari in the southwest, Turag and Tongi Khal in the north, and Balu and Shitalakshya in the east—which support trade, transport, and stormwater drainage. However, the current quality of the river network is very poor, due to the discharge of untreated wastewater from households and industries.

There are several lakes within the city, such as Crescent Lake, Dhanmondi Lake, Baridhara-Gulshan Lake, Banani Lake, Uttara Lake, Hatirjheel-Begunbari Lake, and Ramna Lake.

=== Environmental pollution ===
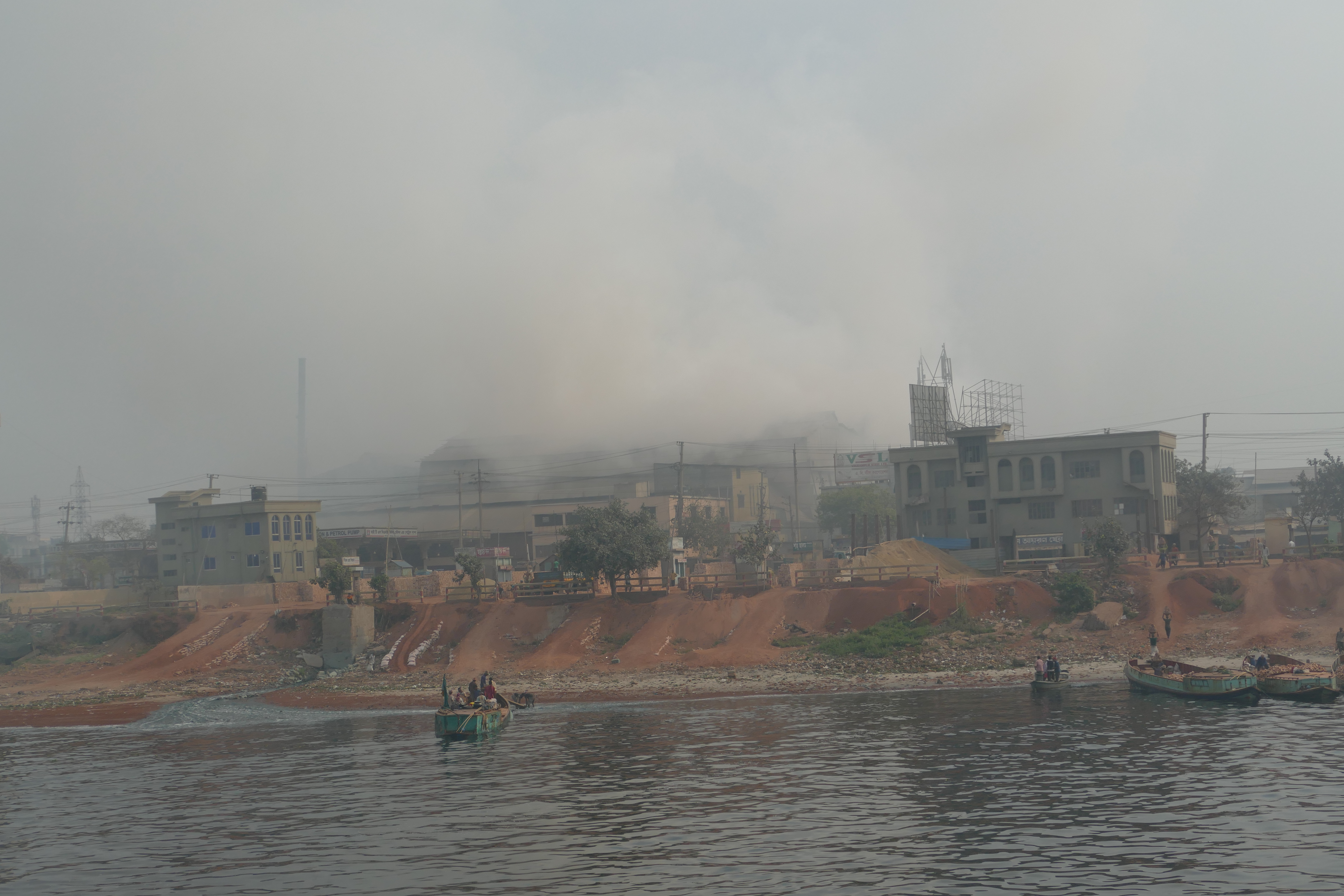
Pollution by a factory on the bank of the Buriganga near Dhaka in 2020

Increasing air and water pollution affects public health and quality of life in the city. The air pollution is caused for example by vehicle traffic and congestion. Also, due to the unregulated manufacturing of bricks and other causes, Dhaka has very high levels of fine particulate matter (PM2.5) air pollution.

Water pollution is caused by the discharge of municipal wastewater from households and industry without treatment. As of 2011 only 20% of the city is connected to a sewer system, whereas 80% is not connected. As a result, the rivers in Dhaka have severe pathogen pollution, as indicated by the fecal coliform count that is several hundred times higher than the recommended national and international standards of less than 200 cfu per litre for bathing and swimming. Chemical surveys in the rivers near Dhaka show extremely high organic pollution loading, high ammonia, and very low dissolved oxygen levels, which are close to zero in the dry season.

In addition to the organic and pathogen pollution load from the 1.2 million m^{3} of untreated sewage, the rivers receive about 60,000 m^{3} of industrial effluent every day from nine major industrial clusters (as of 2021). There are an estimated 500–700 wet processing and dyeing textile factories releasing a range of chemicals including salts, dyes and bleaches, and 155 tanneries discharging heavy metals, including chromium.

Four of the rivers surrounding Dhaka—Buriganga, Sitalakhya, Balu and Turag—are so polluted that they have been declared as ecologically critical areas in 2009 by the Department of Environment. This makes them unsuitable for any human use. Nevertheless, people living in low-income and slum areas still have a lot of direct contact with river water, exposing them to health risks. They use river water for dishwashing, laundry, cleaning fish and vegetables, and personal washing, washing and dyeing denim, washing fish baskets or plastic sheets, collecting plastic waste and fishing. As a result, many of the immediate environmental burdens of river pollution are borne by these low-income residents.

Bodies of water and wetlands around Dhaka face destruction as they are being filled to construct multi-storied buildings and other real estate developments. Coupled with pollution, such erosion of natural habitats threatens to destroy much of the regional biodiversity.

== Government ==
=== Capital city ===
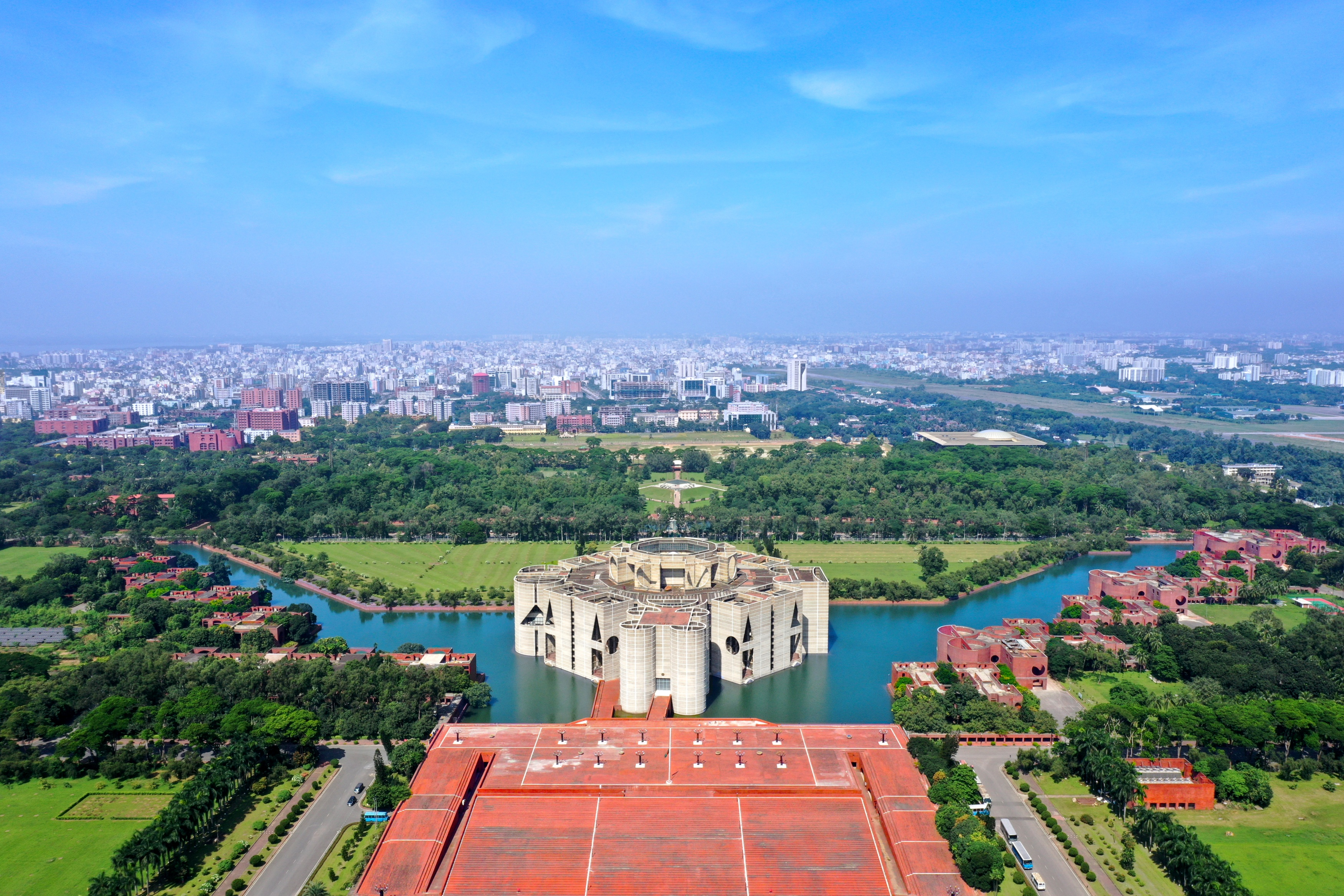
The National Parliament House complex is surrounded by 200 acres of gardens in the centre of the city

As the capital of the People's Republic of Bangladesh, Dhaka is home to numerous state and diplomatic institutions. The Bangabhaban is the official residence and workplace of the President of Bangladesh, who is the ceremonial head of state under the constitution. The National Parliament House is located in the modernist capital complex designed by Louis Kahn in Sher-e-Bangla Nagar, while the Ganabhaban, known for being former prime minister Sheikh Hasina's official residence, is situated on the north side. The Prime Minister's Office is located in Tejgaon. Most ministries of the Government of Bangladesh are housed in the Bangladesh Secretariat. The Supreme Court, the Dhaka High Court and the Foreign Ministry are located in the Segunbagicha-Shahbagh area. The Defence Ministry and the Ministry of Planning are located in Sher-e-Bangla Nagar. The Armed Forces Division of the government of Bangladesh and the army, navy and air force HQs of the Bangladesh Armed Forces are located in Dhaka Cantonment. Several important installations of the Bangladesh Army are also situated in Dhaka and Mirpur Cantonments. The Bangladesh Navy's principal administrative and logistics base, BNS Haji Mohshin, is located in Dhaka. The Bangladesh Air Force maintains the BAF Base Bir Uttom A. K. Khandker and BAF Base Bashar in Dhaka.

Dhaka hosts 54 resident embassies and high commissions and numerous international organizations. Most diplomatic missions are located in the Gulshan and Baridhara areas of the city. The Agargaon area near Parliament is home to the country offices of the United Nations, the World Bank, the Asian Development Bank, and the Islamic Development Bank.

=== Civic administration ===
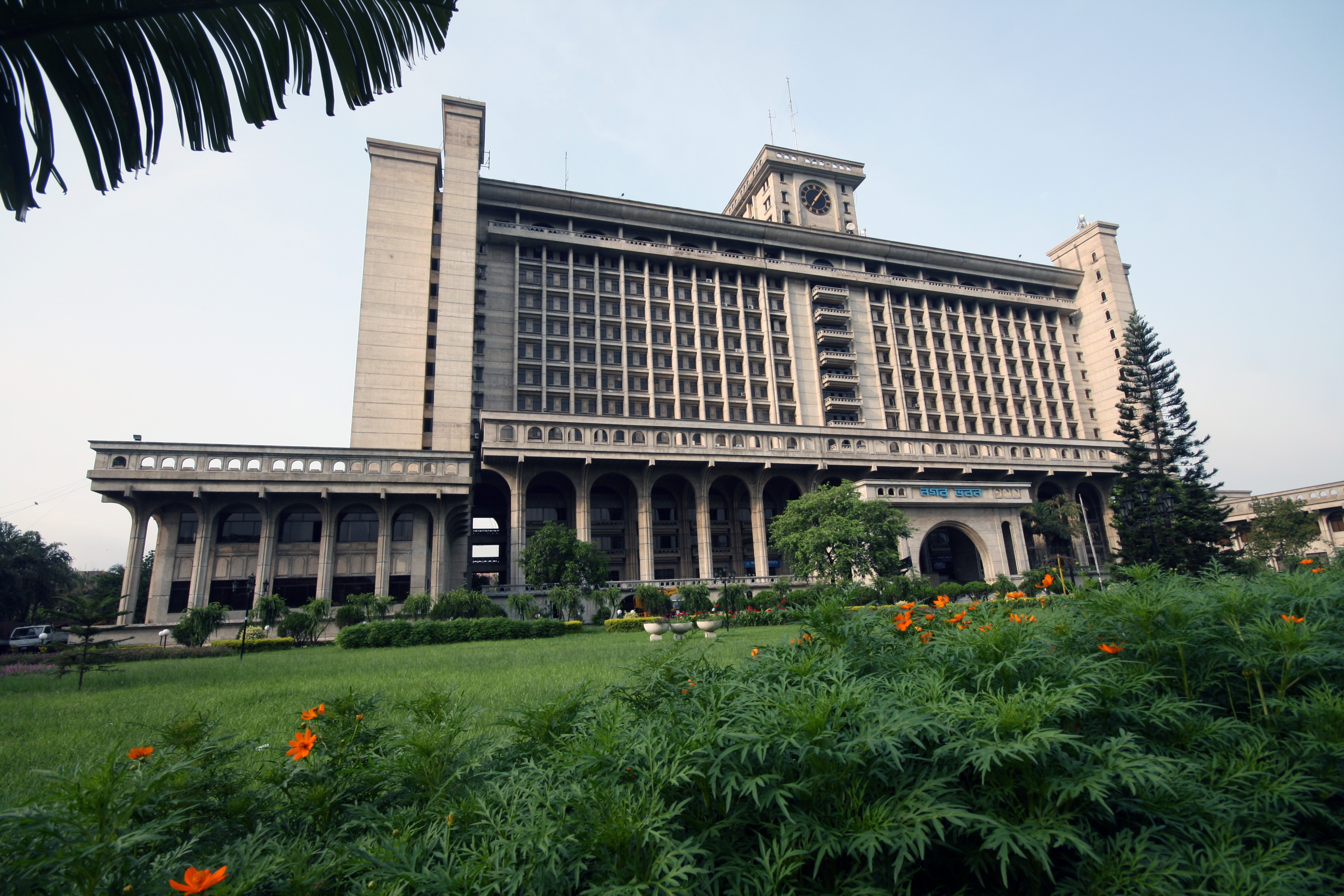
Nagar Bhaban is the seat of the Dhaka South City Corporation

==== History ====
The municipality of Dhaka was founded on 1 August 1864 and upgraded to "Metropolitan" status in 1978. In 1983, the Dhaka City Corporation was created as a self-governing entity to govern Dhaka.

Under a new act in 1993, an election was held in 1994 for the first elected Mayor of Dhaka. The Dhaka City Corporation ran the affairs of the city until November 2011.

==== Municipal government ====
In 2011, the erstwhile Dhaka City Corporation was split into two separate corporations – Dhaka North City Corporation and Dhaka South City Corporation to ensure better civic facilities. These two corporations are headed by two mayors, who are elected by direct vote of the citizen for 5 years. The area within city corporations was divided into several wards, each having an elected commissioner. In total, the city has 130 wards and 725 mohallas.

- RAJUK is responsible for coordinating urban development in the Greater Dhaka area.
- DMP is responsible for maintaining law and order within the metro area. It was established in 1976. DMP has 56 police stations as administrative units.

=== Administrative agencies ===
Unlike other megacities worldwide, Dhaka is serviced by over two dozen government organizations under different ministries. Lack of coordination among them and centralization of all powers by the Government of Bangladesh keeps the development and maintenance of the city in a chaotic situation.

Agency	Service	Parent agency
Dhaka North City Corporation; Dhaka South City Corporation	Public service	Ministry of Local Government, Rural Development and Co-operatives ∟ Local Government Division
Dhaka Metropolitan Police	Law enforcement	Ministry of Home Affairs ∟ Bangladesh Police
RAJUK	Urban planning	Ministry of Housing and Public Works
Dhaka Electric Supply Company Limited; Dhaka Power Distribution Company Limited	Electric power distribution	Ministry of Power, Energy and Mineral Resources ∟ Power Division
Dhaka WASA	Water supply	Ministry of Local Government, Rural Development and Co-operatives ∟ Local Government Division
Dhaka Transport Coordination Authority	Transport	Ministry of Road Transport and Bridges ∟Road Transport and Highways Division

== Economy ==
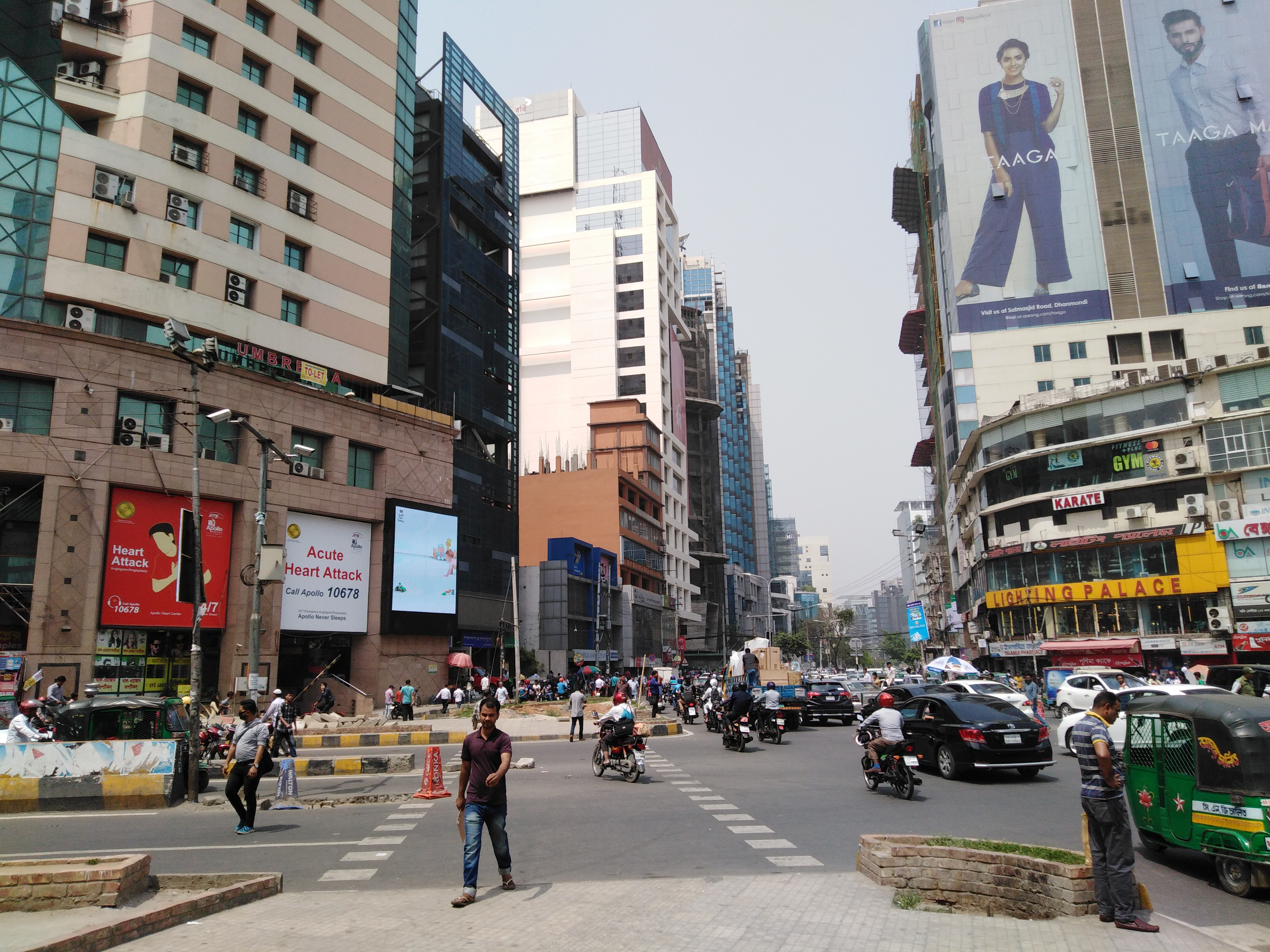
Gulshan-1 intersection

As the most densely industrialized region of the country, the Greater Dhaka Area accounts for 46% of Bangladesh's economy. The Globalization and World Cities Research Network ranks Dhaka as a gamma+ global city, in other words, one that is instrumental in linking their region into the world economy. Major industrial areas are Tejgaon, Shyampur and Hazaribagh. The city has a growing middle class, driving the market for modern consumer and luxury goods. Shopping malls serve as vital elements in the city's economy. The city has historically attracted numerous migrant workers. Hawkers, peddlers, small shops, rickshaw transport, roadside vendors and stalls employ a large segment of the population – rickshaw drivers alone number as many as 400,000. Half the workforce is employed in household and unorganized labour, while about 800,000 work in the textile industry. The unemployment rate in Dhaka was 23% in 2013.

Almost all large local conglomerates have their corporate offices located in Dhaka. Microcredit also began here and the offices of the Nobel Prize-winning Grameen Bank and BRAC (the largest non-governmental development organization in the world) are based in Dhaka. Urban developments have sparked a widespread construction boom; new high-rise buildings and skyscrapers have changed the city's landscape. Growth has been especially strong in the finance, banking, manufacturing, telecommunications, and service sectors, while tourism, hotels, and restaurants continue as important elements of the Dhaka economy.

Dhaka has rising traffic congestion and inadequate infrastructure; the national government has recently implemented a policy for rapid urbanization of surrounding areas and beyond by the introduction of a ten-year relief on income tax for new construction of facilities and buildings outside Dhaka.

=== CBDs ===
The Dhaka metropolitan area boasts several central business districts (CBDs). In the southern part of the city, the riverfront of Old Dhaka is home to many small businesses, factories, and trading companies. Near Old Dhaka lies Motijheel, which is the biggest CBD in Bangladesh. The Motijheel area developed in the 1960s. Motijheel is home to the Bangladesh Bank, the nation's central bank; as well as the headquarters of the largest state-owned banks, including Janata Bank, Pubali Bank, Sonali Bank and Rupali Bank. By the 1990s, the affluent residential neighbourhoods of Gulshan, Banani and Uttara in the northern part of the city became a major business centre and now hosts many international companies operating in Bangladesh. The Purbachal New Town Project is planned as the city's future CBD.

The following is a list of the main CBDs in Dhaka:

- Motijheel
- Kawran Bazar
- Paltan
- Dhanmondi
- Gulshan
- Banani
- Uttara
- Mirpur/DOHS
- Bashundhara Residential Area
- Panthapath
- Maghbazar
- Mohakhali
- Gulistan
- Jatrabari

=== Industrial areas ===
- Tejgaon I/A
- Old Dhaka

=== Trade associations ===
Major trade associations based in the city include:

- Federation of Bangladesh Chambers of Commerce & Industries (FBCCI)
- Dhaka Chamber of Commerce & Industry (DCCI)
- Metropolitan Chamber of Commerce and Industry (MCCI)
- Bangladesh Garment Manufacturers and Exporters Association (BGMEA)
- Bangladesh Knitwear Manufacturers and Exporters Association (BKMEA)
- Newspaper Owners' Association of Bangladesh (NOAB)
- Real Estate and Housing Association of Bangladesh (REHAB)

=== Stock market ===
The Dhaka Stock Exchange (DSE) had a market capitalization of BDT 5,136,979.000 million in 2021. Some of the largest companies listed on the DSE include:

- Grameenphone
- BEXIMCO
- BSRM
- Titas Gas
- Summit Group
- The City Bank
- BRAC Bank
- IDLC Finance Limited
- Square Pharmaceuticals
- Eastern Bank Limited
- Orion Group

== Demographics ==
=== Population ===
Historical population

Year	Pop.	±% p.a.
1951	335,760	—
1961	507,921	+4.23%
1971	1,373,718	+10.46%
1981	3,265,663	+9.05%

Year	Pop.	±% p.a.
1991	6,620,697	+7.32%
2001	10,284,947	+4.50%
2011	14,730,537	+3.66%
2022	22,478,116	+3.92%

for Dhaka Agglomeration:

The city, in combination with localities forming the wider metropolitan area, is home to over 22 million people as of 2022. The population is growing by an estimated 3.3% per year, one of the highest rates among Asian cities. The continuing growth reflects ongoing migration from rural areas to the Dhaka urban region, which accounted for 60% of the city's growth in the 1960s and 1970s. More recently, the city's population has also grown with the expansion of city boundaries, a process that added more than a million people to the city in the 1980s. According to the Far Eastern Economic Review, Dhaka will be home to 25 million people by the end of 2025.

This rapid population growth makes it difficult for the city government to provide the necessary infrastructure in a timely manner, e.g. for water supply, electricity and waste management.

==== Slums ====
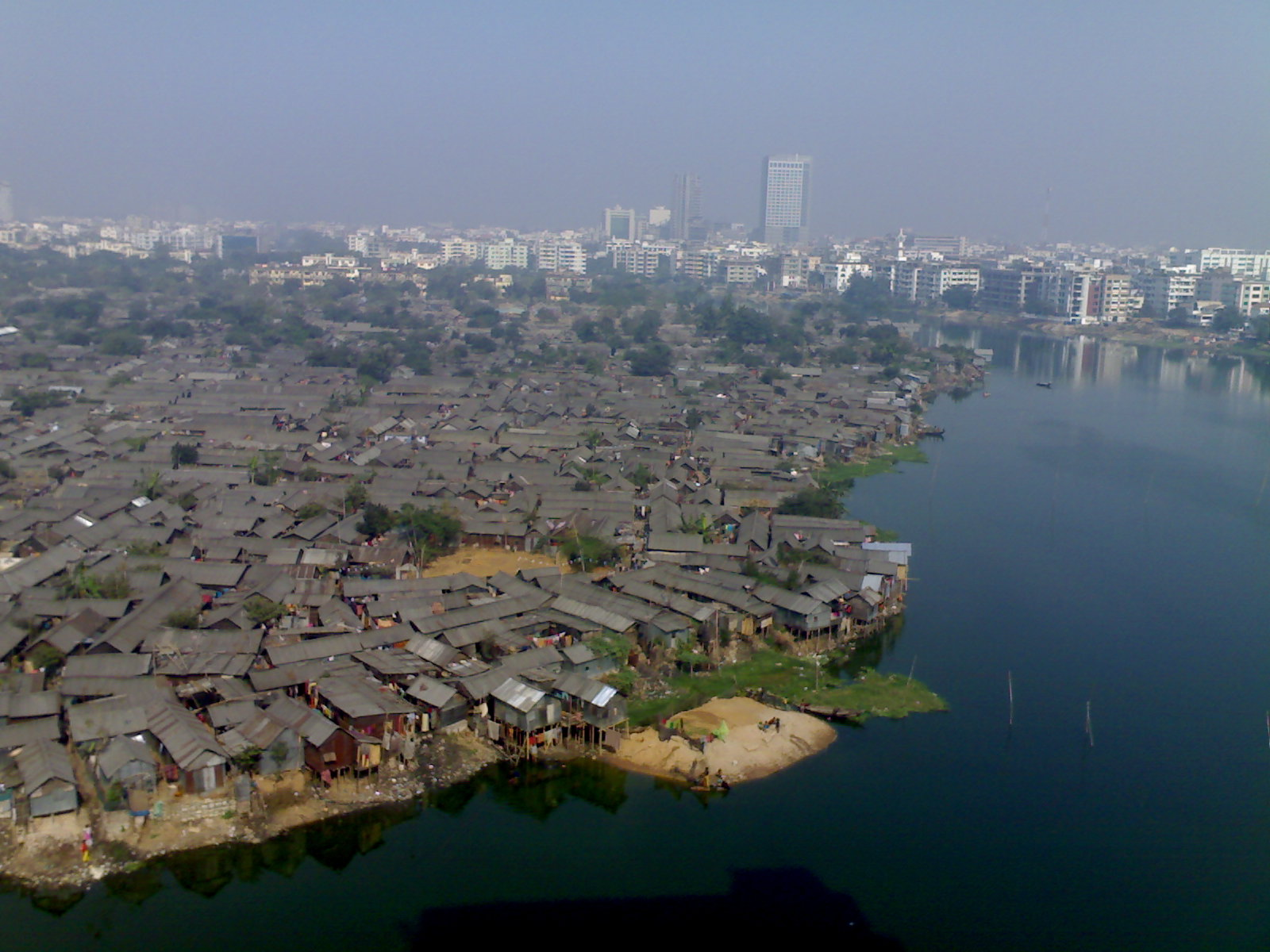
The Korail slum in Banani

About 30% of Dhaka's population lives in slums (or unplanned urban settlements), as of 2016. Estimates from 2011 and 2015 found that there are about "3 to 5 thousand slums and squatter settlements scattered all over the city". It is often the new arrivals, people migrating from rural areas, who end up living in slums. People only have very limited access to water, sanitation and other services in those slum areas.

Slums may be found in the outskirts and in less-visible areas such as alleyways. As of 2021, the largest slum is in Kamrangirchar, where about 600,000 people live in slum conditions.

=== Ethnicity ===
The city population is composed of people from virtually every region of Bangladesh. The long-standing inhabitants of the old city are known as Dhakaiya and have a distinctive Bengali dialect and culture. Dhaka is also home to a large number of Bihari refugees, who are descendants of migrant Muslims from eastern India during 1947 and settled down in East Pakistan. The correct population of Biharis living in the city is ambiguous, but it is estimated that there are at least 300,000 Urdu-speakers in all of Bangladesh, mostly residing in old Dhaka and in refugee camps in Dhaka, although official figures estimate only 40,000. Between 15,000 and 20,000 of the Rohingya, Santal, Khasi, Garo, Chakma and Mandi tribal peoples reside in the city.

=== Language ===
Language in Dhaka (2011)
1. Bengali (98.0%)
2. Urdu (1.00%)
3. Others (1.00%)

Most residents of Dhaka speak Bengali, the national language. Other than Standard Bengali which is used in business and education, most prominent Bengali dialects spoken in the city include an Urban East Bengal Colloquial dialect, and Dhakaiya Kutti spoken in Old Dhaka. English is spoken by a large segment of the population, especially for business purposes. The city has both Bengali and English newspapers. Urdu, including Dhakaiya Urdu, is spoken by members of several non-Bengali communities, including the Biharis.

=== Literacy ===
The literacy rate in Dhaka is also increasing quickly. It was estimated at 69.2% in 2001. The literacy rate had gone up to 74.6% by 2011 which is significantly higher than the national average of 72%.

=== Religion ===
Religion in Dhaka City (2022)
Religion	Percent
Islam	95.69%
Hinduism	3.68%
Christianity	0.48%
Buddhism	0.13%
Other or not stated	0.02%

According to 2022 cencus, Islam is the dominant religion of the city, with 9,851,610 population of the DNCC and DSCC combined population and a majority belonging to the Sunni sect. There is also a small Shia sect, and an Ahmadiyya community. Hinduism is the second-largest religion numbering around 379,161 adherents. Smaller segments represent practise Christianity with 49,444 population, Buddhism with 13,504 and 1,688 others.

Religious groups in Dhaka City (1872–2022) (Note: 1872–1941: Data for the entirety of the town of Dhaka, which included Dhaka Municipality.)
Religious group	1872		1881		1891		1901		1911		1921		1931		1941		2022	
Religious group	Pop.	%	Pop.	%	Pop.	%	Pop.	%	Pop.	%	Pop.	%	Pop.	%	Pop.	%	Pop.	%
Hinduism	34,433	49.75%	39,635	50.12%	41,566	50.49%	48,668	53.75%	60,235	55.49%	69,330	58.04%	80,024	57.77%	129,233	60.61%	379,161	3.68%
Islam	34,275	49.52%	38,918	49.22%	40,183	48.81%	41,361	45.68%	47,295	43.57%	49,325	41.29%	57,764	41.7%	82,683	38.78%	9,851,610	95.69%
Christianity	479	0.69%	—N/a	—N/a	467	0.57%	484	0.53%	898	0.83%	710	0.59%	683	0.49%	349	0.16%	49,444	0.48%
Buddhism	4	0.01%	—N/a	—N/a	76	0.09%	28	0.03%	85	0.08%	12	0.01%	26	0.02%	—N/a	—N/a	13,504	0.13%
Jainism	—N/a	—N/a	—N/a	—N/a	13	0.02%	0	0%	0	0%	5	0%	5	0%	0	0%	—N/a	—N/a
Tribal	—N/a	—N/a	—N/a	—N/a	9	0.01%	1	0%	13	0.01%	1	0%	0	0%	—N/a	—N/a	—N/a	—N/a
Sikhism	—N/a	—N/a	—N/a	—N/a	1	0%	0	0%	16	0.01%	67	0.06%	16	0.01%	53	0.02%	—N/a	—N/a
Judaism	—N/a	—N/a	—N/a	—N/a	1	0%	0	0%	8	0.01%	4	0%	0	0%	—N/a	—N/a	—N/a	—N/a
Zoroastrianism	—N/a	—N/a	—N/a	—N/a	0	0%	0	0%	1	0%	6	0.01%	0	0%	—N/a	—N/a	—N/a	—N/a
Others	21	0.03%	528	0.67%	5	0.01%	0	0%	0	0%	0	0%	0	0%	890	0.42%	2,182	0.02%
Total population	69,212	100%	79,076	100%	82,321	100%	90,542	100%	108,551	100%	119,450	100%	138,518	100%	213,218	100%	10,295,407	116.98%

== Infrastructure ==
=== Transport ===
Motorcycles comprised half of Dhaka's registered vehicles in 2023, while car ownership rate is only six per cent. One of the world's least motorized cities, the three-wheeled cycle rickshaw is the most popular and ubiquitous mode of transport, which accounted for 54 per cent of vehicle trips in 2011. Dhaka is among the most congested cities in the world, and traffic was estimated to cost the local economy US$6.5 billion per year in 2020. The average speed of a car travelling in the city is less than 7 kilometres per hour (4.3 mph). Auto rickshaws powered by compressed natural gas, often referred to by locals as "CNGs", are also a popular mode of transport.

==== Road ====
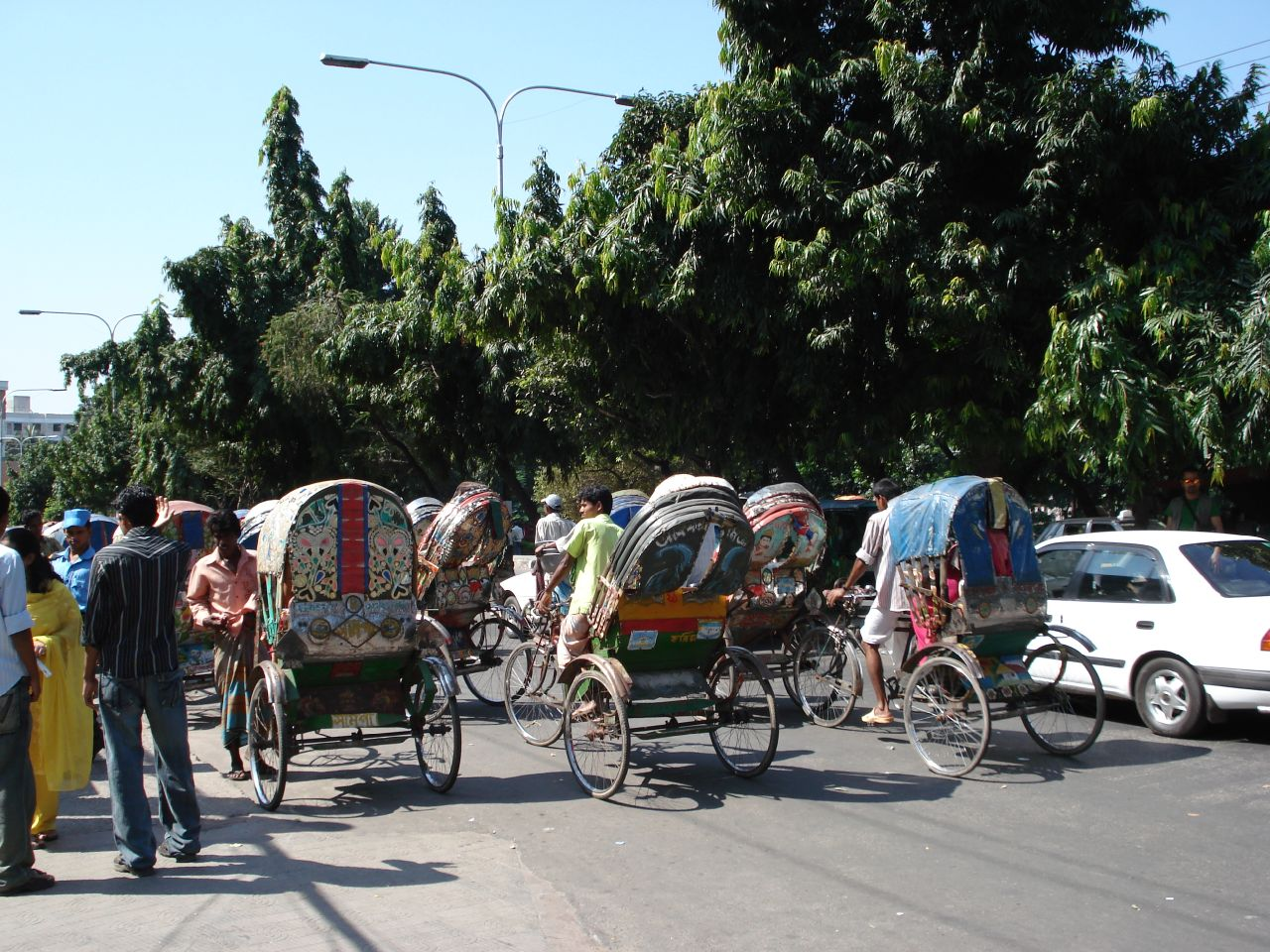
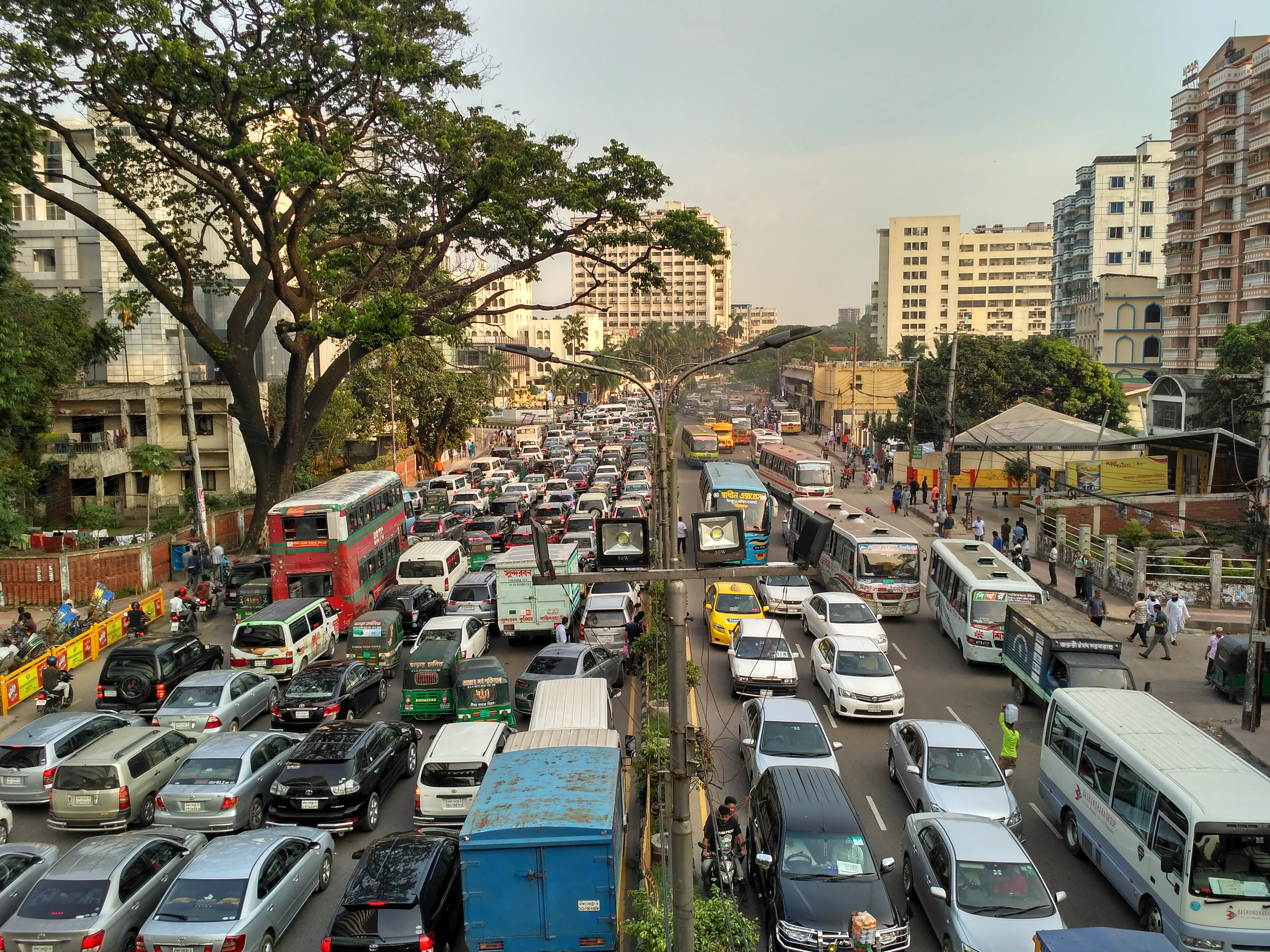
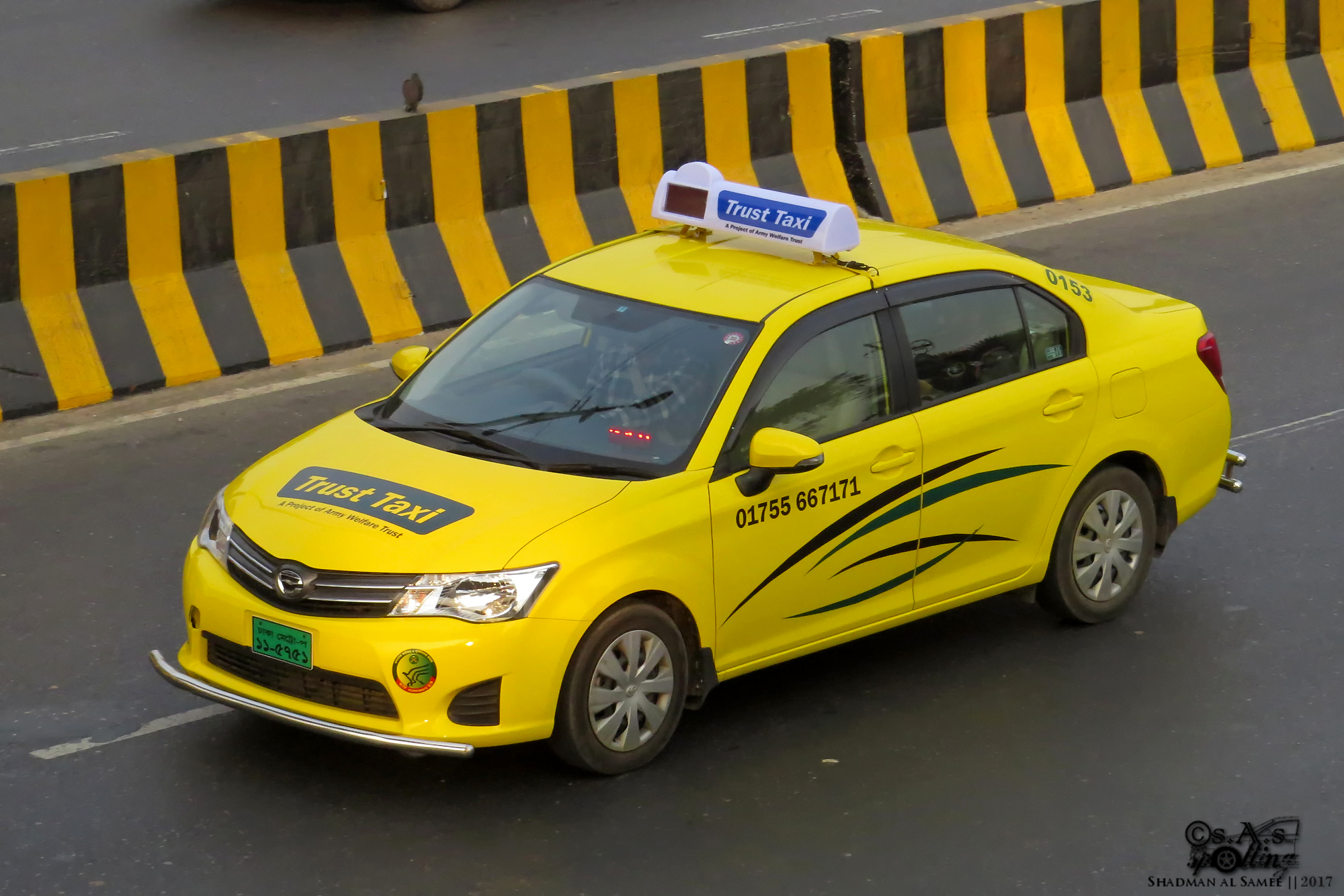
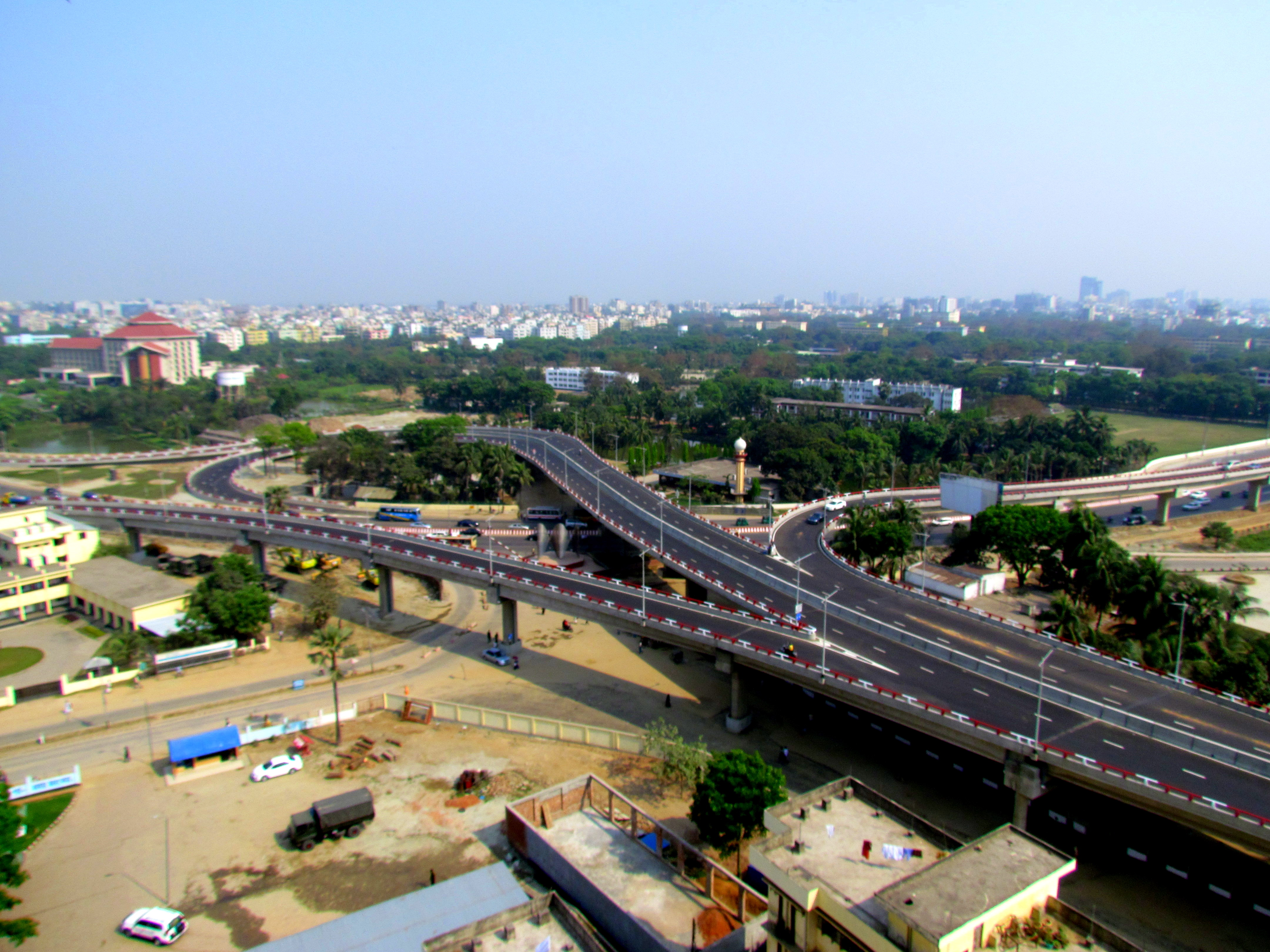
Clockwise from top-left: heavy rickshaw traffic in Dhaka, congested main road, Mirpur-Banani flyover and Dhaka yellow taxi.

The city is connected to other parts of the country through highway and railway links. Five of Bangladesh's eight major national highways start from the city: N1, N2, N3, N5 and N8. Dhaka is also directly connected to the two longest routes of the Asian Highway Network: AH1 and AH2, as well as to the AH41 route. Highway links to the Indian cities of Kolkata, Agartala, Guwahati and Shillong have been established by the BRTC and private bus companies, which also run regular international bus services to those cities from Dhaka.

The Dhaka Elevated Expressway, the first of its kind in the country, improves connectivity between the northern part of the city and the central, southern, and south-eastern parts. An extension, the Dhaka–Ashulia Elevated Expressway, is expected to open in 2026.

==== Rickshaws ====
Cycle rickshaws and CNG auto-rickshaws are the main modes of transport within the metro area, with more than 1.5 million rickshaws running each day: the highest number in any city in the world. However, only around 220 thousand rickshaws are licensed by the city government. Over 15,000 legally registered CNGs serve passengers in Dhaka, with thousands more operating illegally.

==== Ride sharing ====
Since 2016, Uber and Pathao have dominated the ride-sharing market in Dhaka, which offer both car and motorcycle services. Ride-sharing services have led to a decline in the use of CNG auto-rickshaws, although Uber has expanded its services to include CNG auto-rickshaws in 2021.

==== Bus ====
Buses carried about 1.9 million passengers per day in 2007. Public buses in Dhaka are primarily operated by numerous private companies, with a minority run by the state-owned Bangladesh Road Transport Corporation (BRTC). BRTC buses are red, based initially on the Routemaster buses of London. There are three inter-district bus terminals in Dhaka, which are located in the city's Mohakhali, Saidabad, and Gabtoli areas. It is now planned to move three inter-district bus terminals outside the town. Highway links to the Indian cities of Kolkata, Agartala, Guwahati and Shillong have been established by the BRTC and private bus companies, which also run regular international bus services to those cities from Dhaka.

Set to open in December 2024, the 20.5-kilometre (12.7 mi) Dhaka Bus Rapid Transit system is expected to reduce travel time from Dhaka to the satellite town of Gazipur from as long as four hours to just 35–40 minutes.

==== Waterways ====
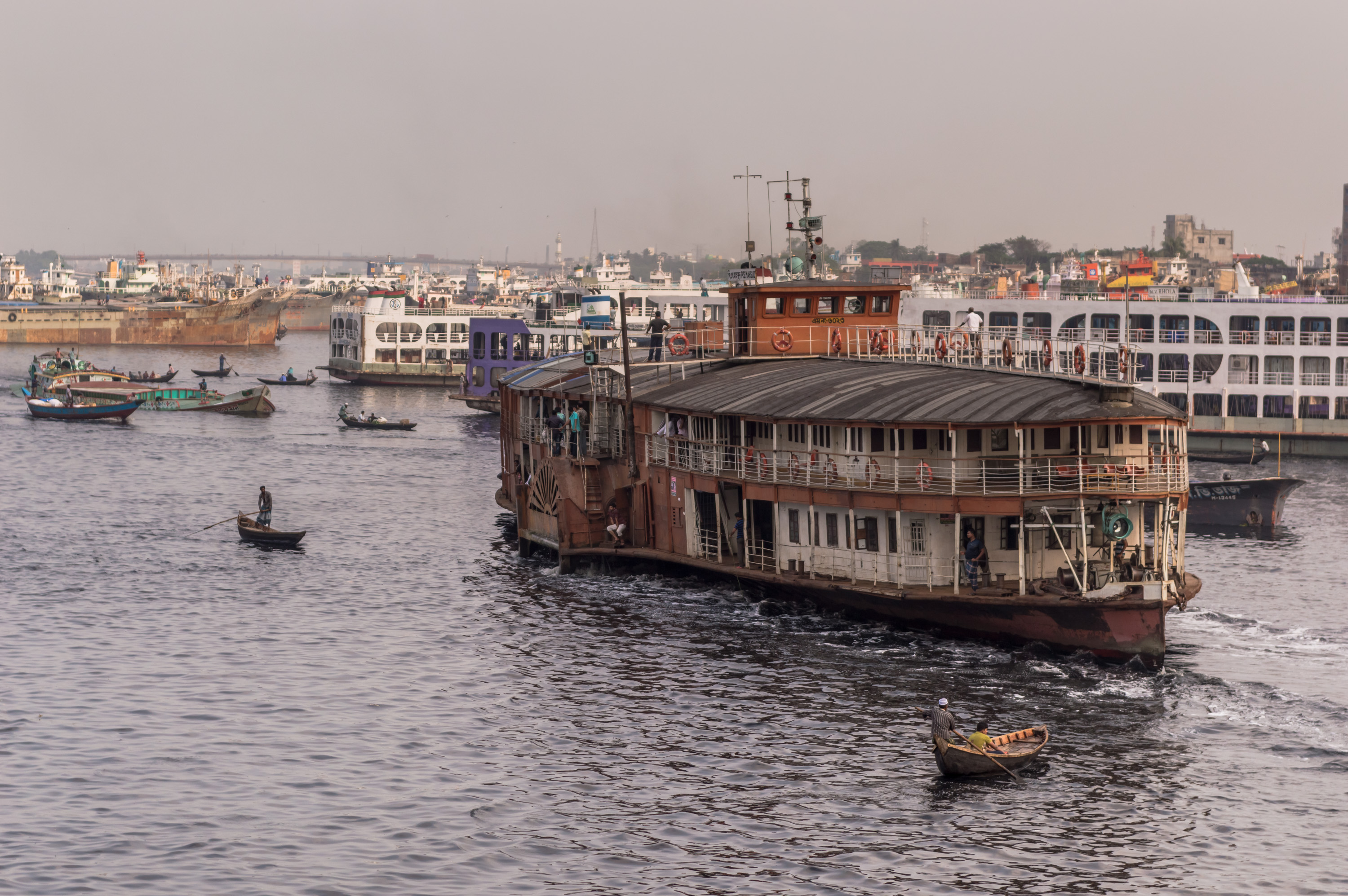
Some boats and launches on the river Buriganga.

The Sadarghat River Port on the banks of the Buriganga River serves for the transport of goods and passengers upriver and to other ports in Bangladesh. Inter-city and inter-district motor vessels and passenger ferry services are used by many people to travel riverine regions of the country from the city. Water bus services are available on the Buriganga River and Hatirjheel and Gulshan lakes, providing connectivity via two routes, Tejgaon–Gulshan and Tejgaon–Rampura.

==== Rail ====
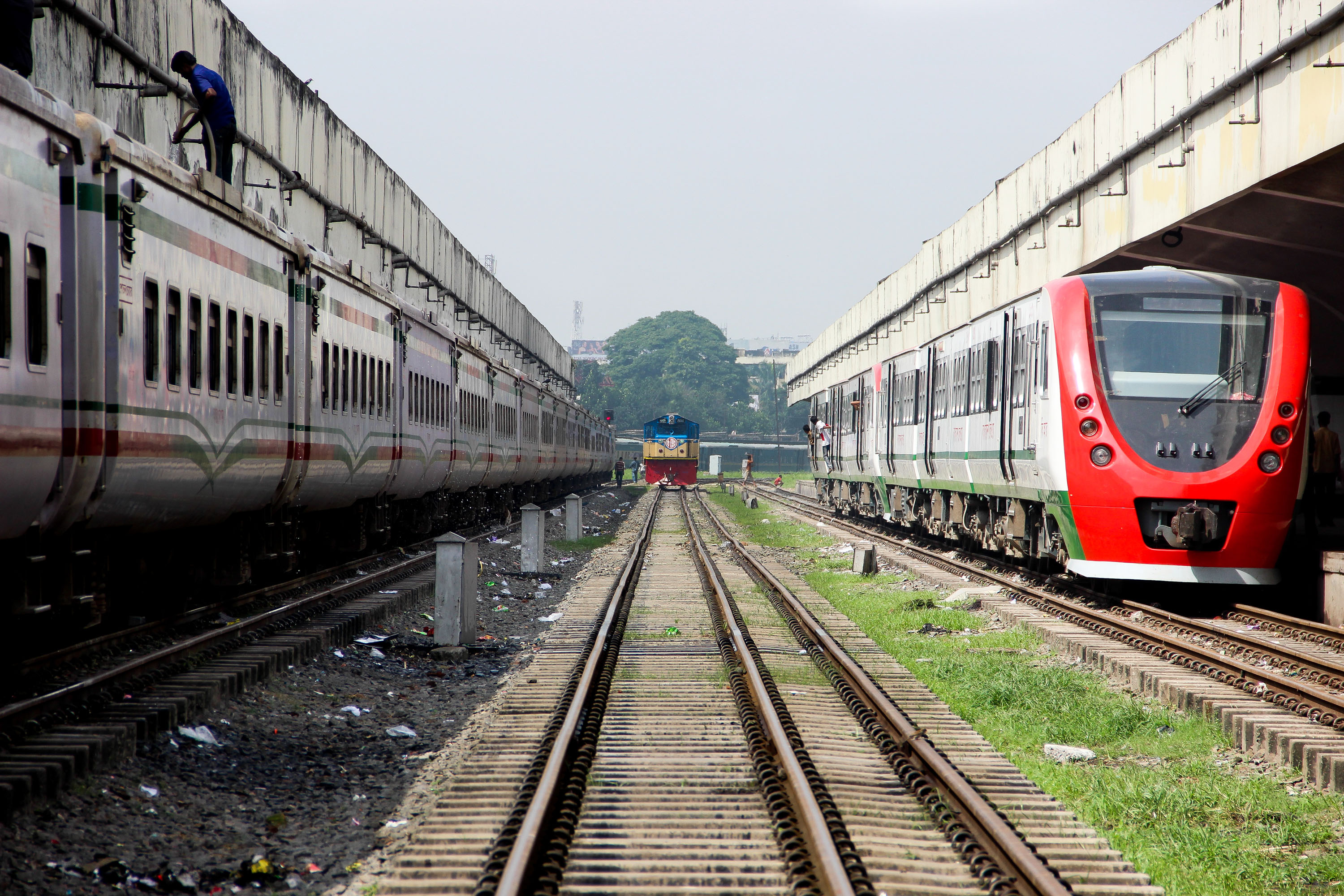
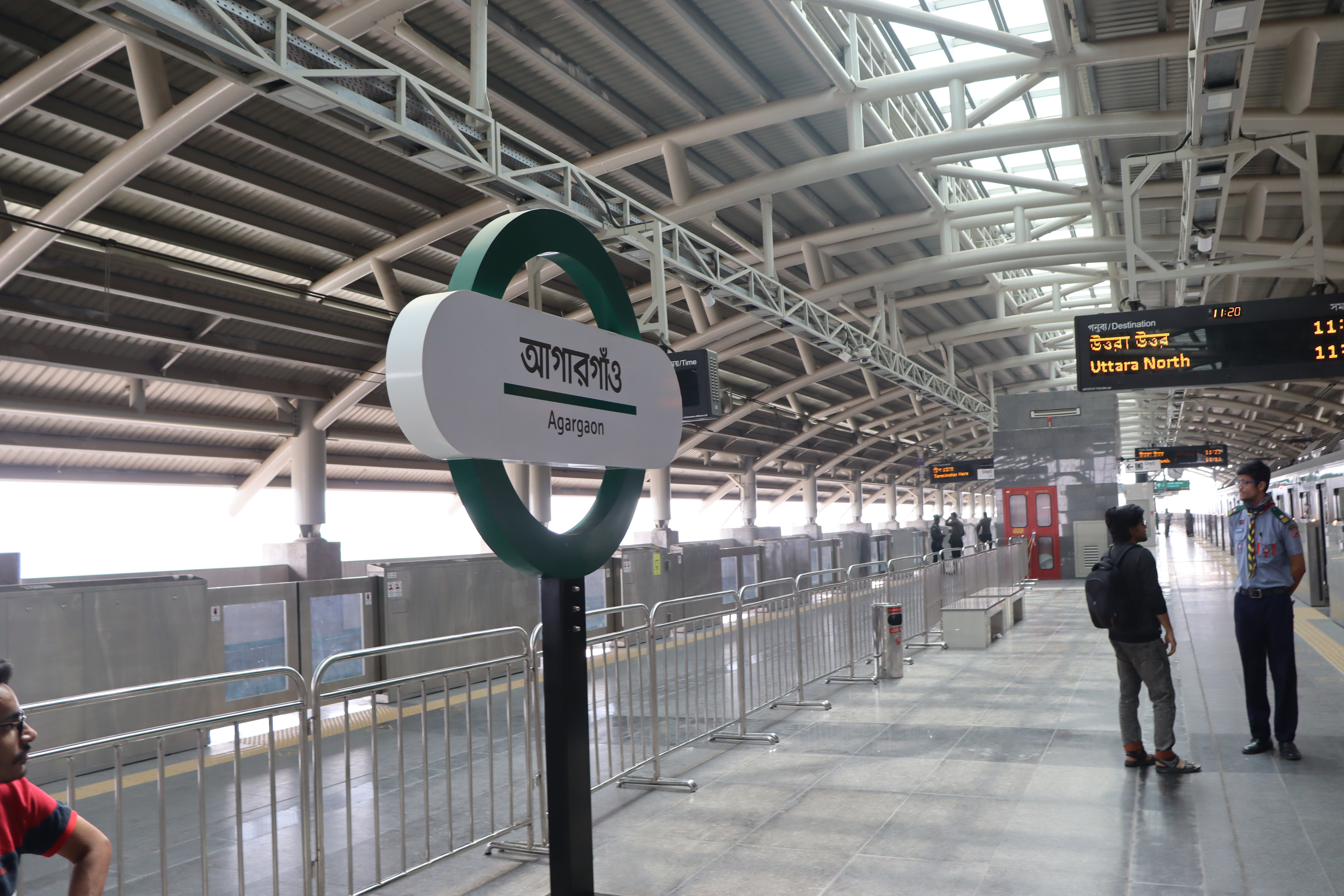
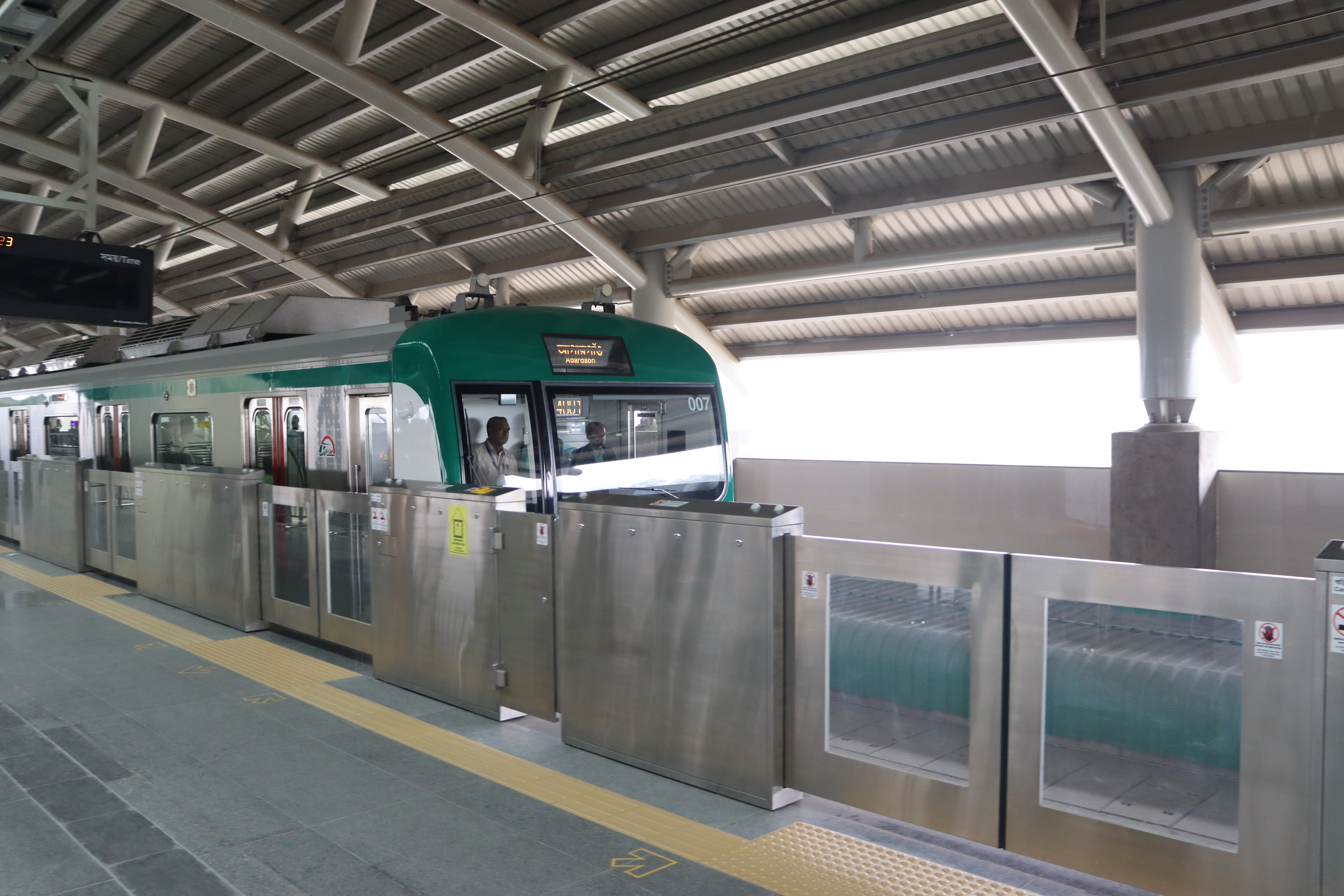
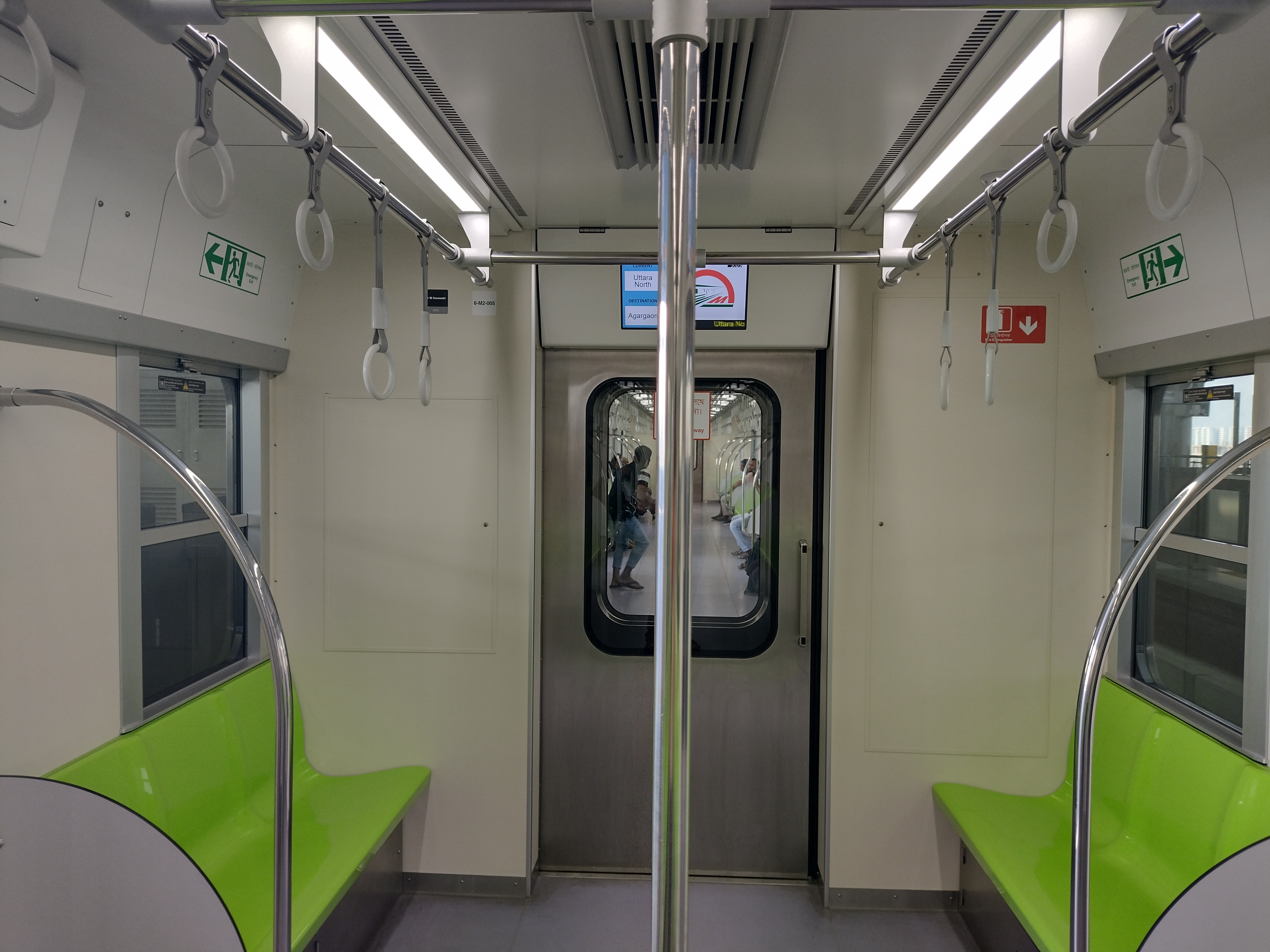
Clockwise from top-left: DEMU Train at Kamalapur Railway Station, Metro Rail station sign in Agargaon, Metro train interior and exterior.

Kamalapur railway station, situated on the northeast side of Motijheel, is the largest and busiest of the city's railway stations. It was designed by American architect Robert Boughey and was completed in 1969. The state-owned Bangladesh Railway provides suburban and national services, with regular express train services connecting Dhaka with other major urban areas, such as Chittagong, Rajshahi, Khulna, Sylhet and Rangpur. The Maitree Express and the Mitali Express provides connections from Dhaka to West Bengal in India.

Dhaka Metro Rail is a mass rapid transit system serving the city. It is a part of the 20-year-long Strategic Transport Plan (STP) outlined by the Dhaka Transport Coordination Authority (DTCA). The first phase of Dhaka Metro's MRT Line 6 was inaugurated by Prime Minister Sheikh Hasina and commenced commercial operations on 28 December 2022.

The metro network is planned to contain six lines. Before the opening of the Dhaka Metro Rail, Dhaka was the biggest city in the world without a mass rapid transit system. Unrelated to the metro, there is also a proposal to build a subway and an orbital railway system.

==== Air ====
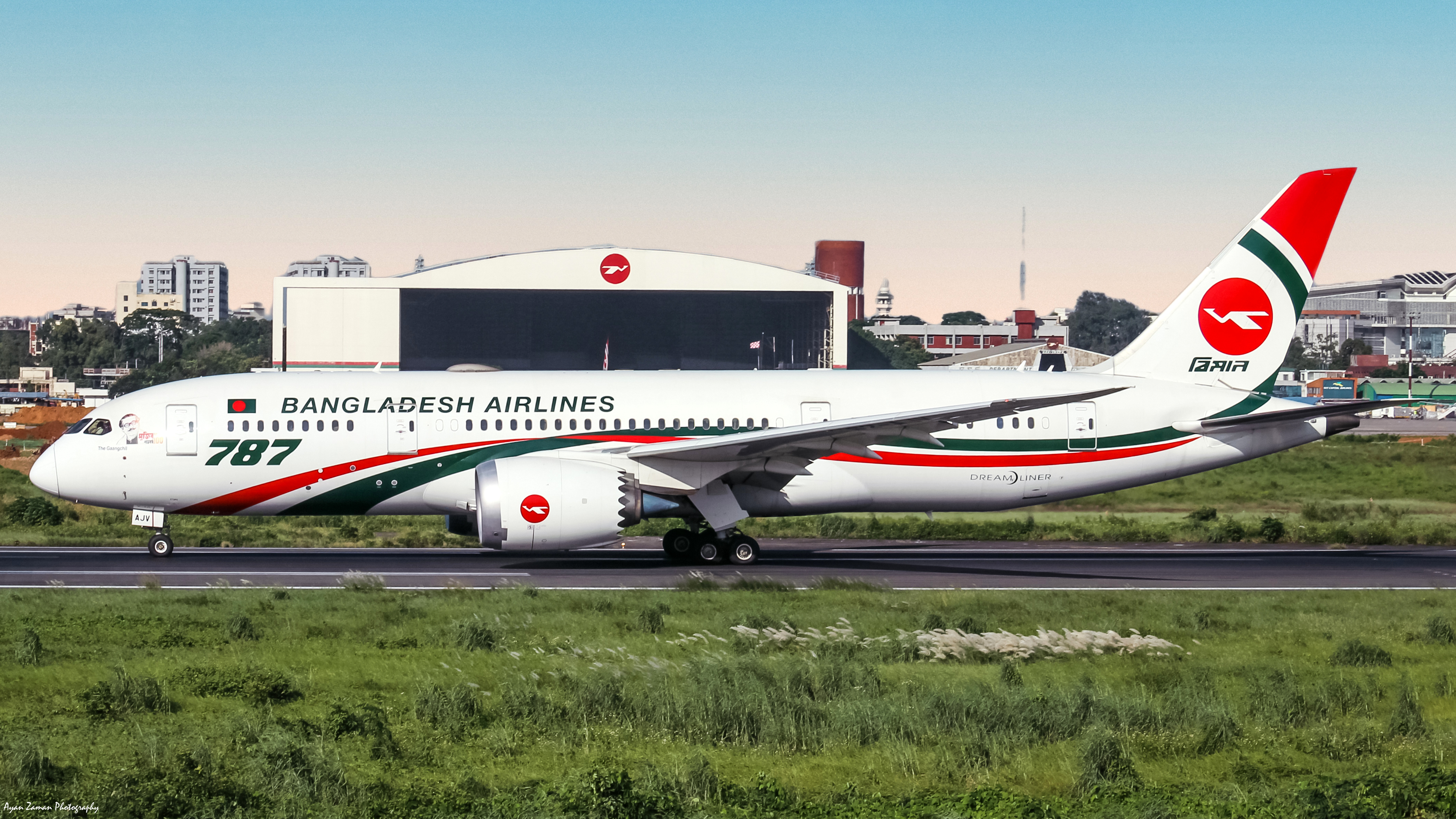
Biman Bangladesh in Hazrat Shahjalal International Airport

Hazrat Shahjalal International Airport (formerly Zia International Airport), located 15 kilometres (9.3 mi) north of Dhaka city centre, is the largest and busiest international airport in the country. Although built with an annual passenger-handling capacity of 8 million, it handled more than 11 million passengers in 2023. The average aircraft movement per day is around 330 flights. It is the hub of most Bangladeshi airlines. Domestic service flies to Chittagong, Sylhet, Rajshahi, Cox's Bazar, Jessore, Barisal, and Saidpur (Rangpur), and international services fly to major cities in Asia, Europe and the Middle East. The airport's capacity is expected to more than double to 20 million once the modern third terminal opens fully in October 2024. According to the project design, the third terminal will have 12 boarding bridges and 16 conveyor belts. The terminal will have 115 check-in counters and 128 immigration desks.

=== Water supply and sanitation ===
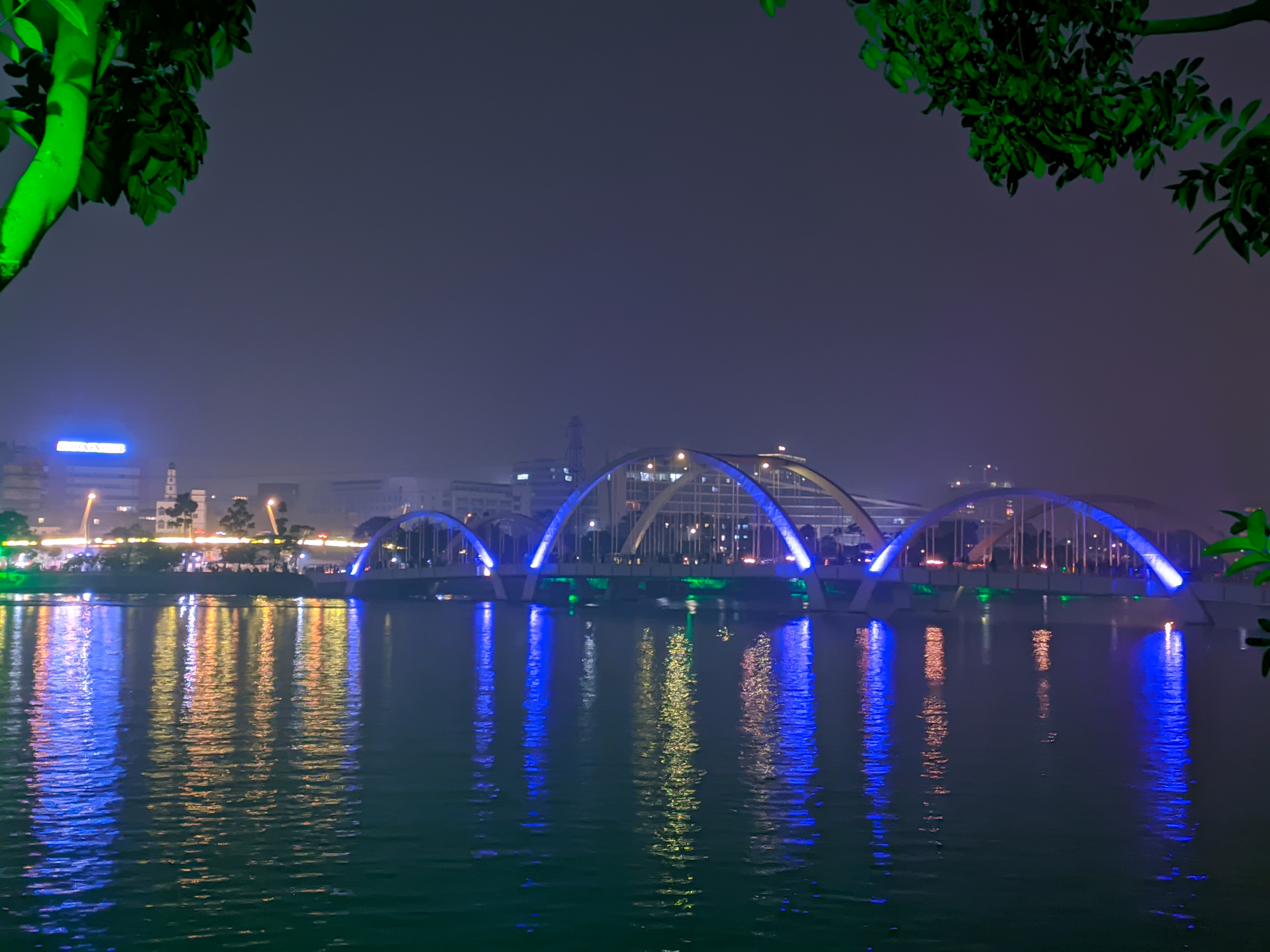
Hatirjheel Lake is a key water reservoir in Dhaka. Its lakefront was transformed from a slum area into a bypass under an urban renewal project

Water management in Dhaka faces numerous challenges such as flooding, poor service quality, groundwater depletion, inadequate sanitation, polluted river water, unplanned urban development, and the existence of large slums.

The Dhaka Water Supply and Sewerage Authority (Dhaka WASA) is "responsible for providing drinking water, sewerage, and storm-water drainage services to the city". The work of Dhaka WASA is funded by the Ministry of Local Government, Rural Development, and Cooperatives.

87% of the city's growing water demand is sourced from groundwater (as of 2021). This is because the extreme contamination of rivers and lakes makes surface water treatment economically and technologically unfeasible. While around 20% of the daily demand of 2.4 billion litres of water is met with surface water from five treatment plants, the groundwater table is falling at a rate of two to three metres per year.

The Bangladesh Urban Informal Settlements Survey 2016 included a representative sample of 588 households across small, medium and large slums in Dhaka. It showed that 68% of the households accessed piped water through a shared connection within the slum compound. The poorest households shared a waterpoint with 43 other households on average compared to 23 sharers among the richest households. In terms of sanitation, only 8% of the slum households had access to a flush toilet connected to a septic tank, while 78% used improved pit latrines and the remaining 10% depended on hanging latrines.

=== Sewage treatment plants ===
The sewage system is inadequate, with 70 per cent of the two million cubic metres of sewage produced daily being discharged into rivers, according to wastewater management experts. Due to improper maintenance and the age of the system, the majority of the sewerage network is out of operation. Most buildings handle their own sewage by constructing soak pits or septic tanks, often connected to storm drains. Consequently, 80 per cent of faecal sludge ends up in rivers, according to experts.

Dhaka is served by two sewage treatment plants. The Pagla Sewerage Treatment Plant (PSTP) in Narayanganj District has a capacity of 120 megalitres per day but can only utilise one-third of its capacity, handling just 10 per cent of the city's waste. The Dasherkandi Sewage Treatment Plant, opened in 2023, is South Asia's largest, with a capacity to treat 500 megalitres, or 20–25% of the city's 2,000 megalitres of sewage generated daily. However, it is also hampered by a lack of sewage connections.

As of 2023, the Bangladesh Government and the Dhaka Water Supply and Sewerage Authority (DWASA) are implementing an ambitious plan, called Dhaka Sewerage Master Plan, to treat most of the residential and industrial wastewater through the construction of several sewage treatment plants. The Bangladesh Government is planning to install over 12 large new sewage treatment plants over the next 20 years.

== Culture ==
=== Literature ===
Dhaka is a major centre for Bengali literature. It has been the hub of Bengali Muslim literature for more than a century. Its heritage also includes historic Urdu and Persian literary traditions. Dark Diamond by Shazia Omar in set in Mughal-era Dhaka during the reign of Shaista Khan, the Mughal viceroy and uncle of Emperor Aurangzeb.The Soldier in the Attic by Akhteruzzaman Elias is considered to be one of the best depictions of life in Old Dhaka and is set during Bengali uprisings in 1969. A Golden Age by Tahmima Anam is also set in Dhaka during the Bangladeshi War of Independence and includes references to the Dhaka Club, the Dhaka University and the Dhanmondi area.

=== Textiles ===
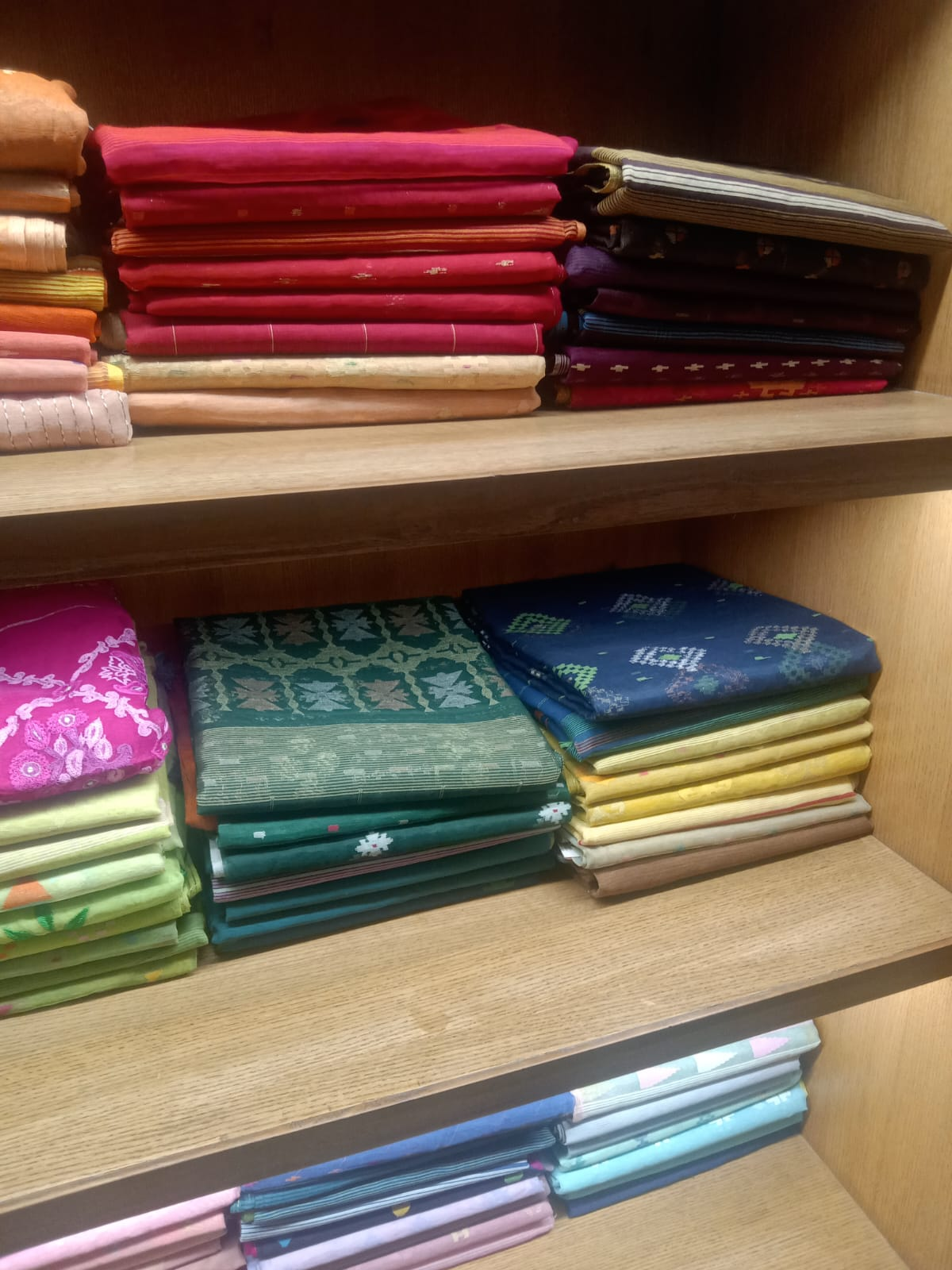
Indigenous sari fabrics, including Jamdani, at a store in Dhaka

For centuries, the region around Dhaka has been the centre of production for fine cotton textiles. Muslin was abundantly produced in the region. The weavers of Dhaka were patronized by the rulers of Bengal and Delhi. They supplied textiles to the Mughal imperial court. The city of Dhaka became one of the most important centres of the cotton textile trade in the 17th century; it was the capital of the Muslin trade in Bengal. Merchants from around the world came to Dhaka to buy its much sought after cotton fabrics. UNESCO has recognized Jamdani muslin as an intangible cultural heritage. According to UNESCO, "Jamdani is a vividly patterned, sheer cotton fabric, traditionally woven on a handloom by craftspeople and apprentices around Dhaka". UNESCO believes "the Jamdani sari is a symbol of identity, dignity and self-recognition and provides wearers with a sense of cultural identity and social cohesion. The weavers develop an occupational identity and take great pride in their heritage; they enjoy social recognition and are highly respected for their skills".

=== Festivals ===
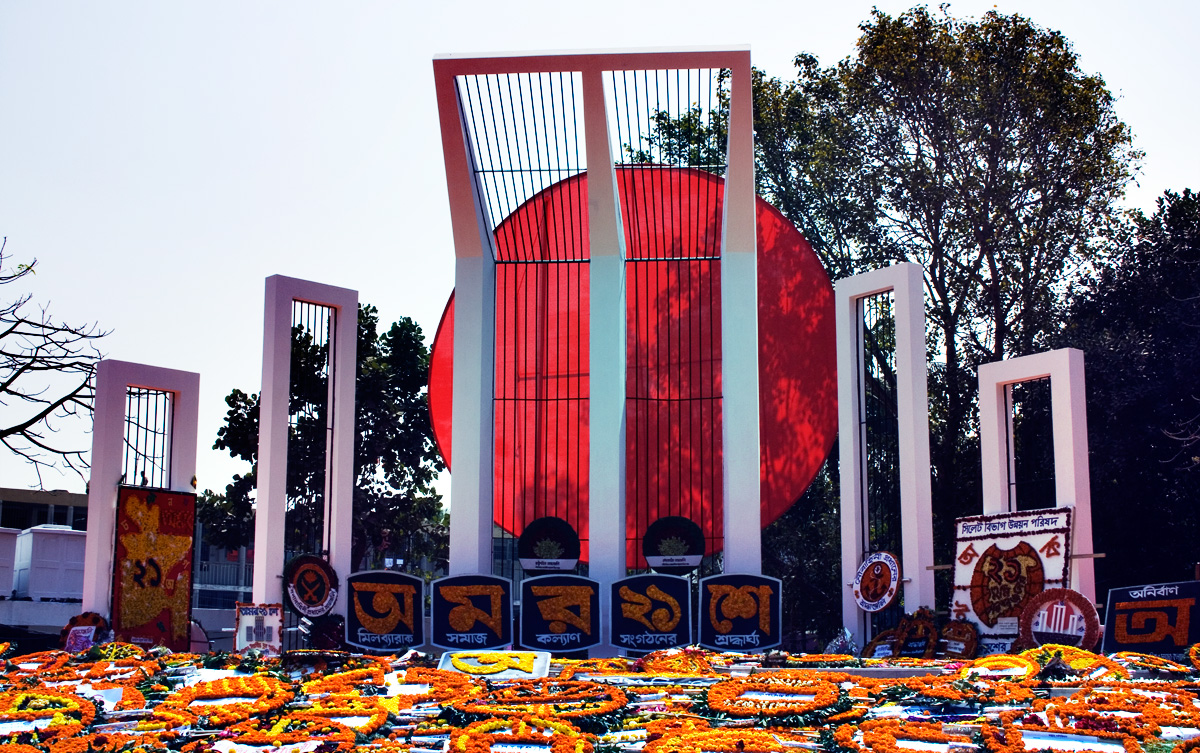
The Central Shaheed Minar on Language Movement Day

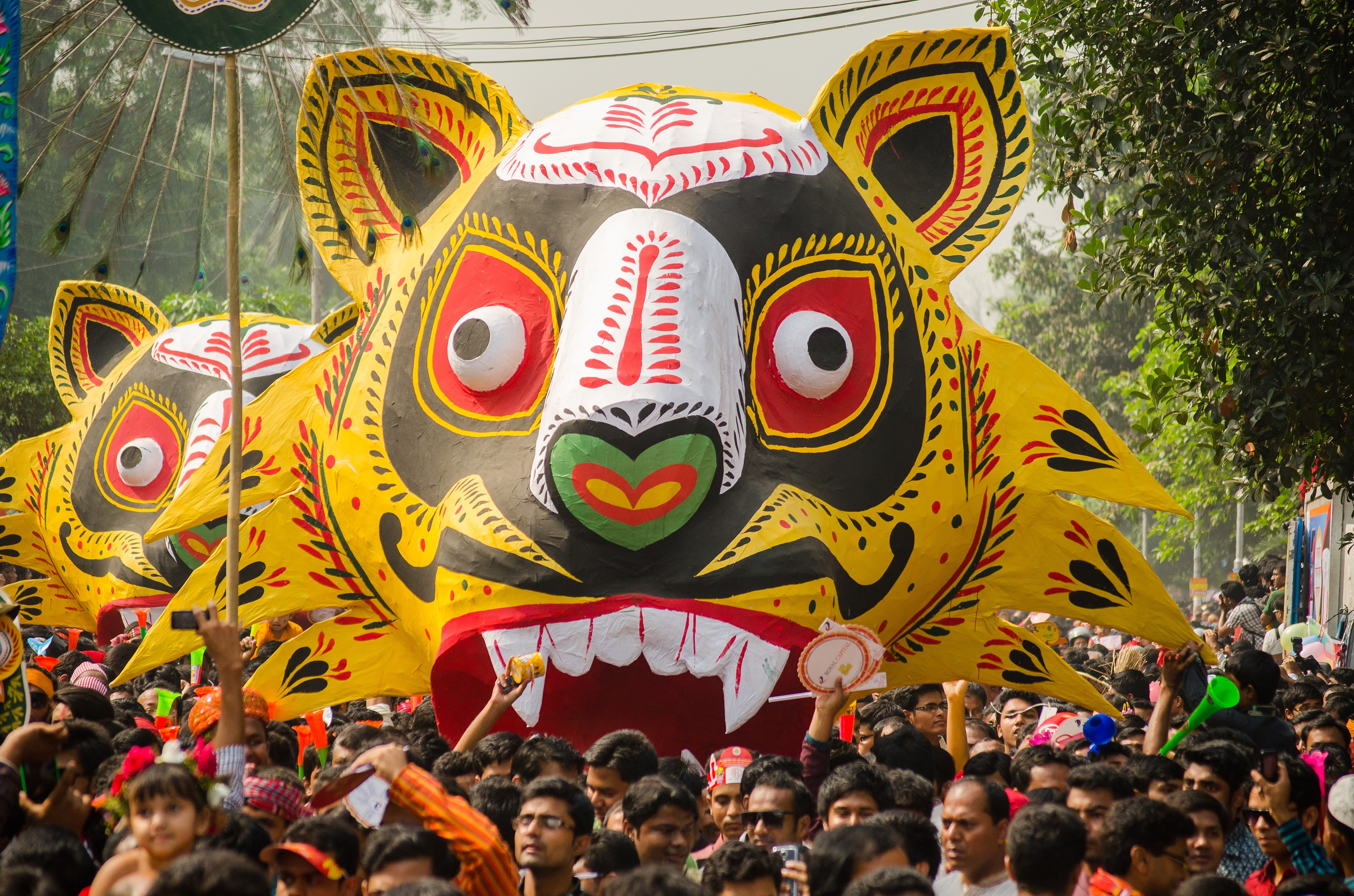
Dhaka's annual Mangal Shobhajatra during the Bengali New Year is recognized by UNESCO as an intangible cultural heritage of humanity

Annual celebrations for Language Martyrs' Day (21 February), Independence Day (26 March), and Victory Day (16 December) are prominently celebrated across the city. Dhaka's people congregate at the Shaheed Minar and the Jatiyo Smriti Soudho to remember the national heroes of the liberation war. These occasions are observed with public ceremonies and rallies on public grounds. Many schools and colleges organize fairs, festivals, and concerts in which citizens from all levels of society participate.Pohela Baishakh, the Bengali New Year, falls annually on 14 April and is popularly celebrated across the city. Large crowds of people gather on the streets of Shahbag, Ramna Park and the campus of the University of Dhaka for celebrations. Pahela Falgun, the first day of spring of the month Falgun in the Bengali calendar, is also festively celebrated in the city. This day is marked with colourful celebration and traditionally, women wear yellow saris to celebrate this day. This celebration is also known as Basanta Utsab (Spring Festival). Nabanna is a harvest celebration, usually celebrated with food and dance, and music on the 1st day of the month of Agrahayan of the Bengali year. Birthdays of Rabindranath Tagore and Kazi Nazrul Islam are observed respectively as Rabindra Jayanti and Nazrul Jayanti. The Ekushey Book Fair, which is arranged each year by Bangla Academy, takes place for the whole month of February. This event is dedicated to the martyrs who died on 21 February 1952 in a demonstration calling for the establishment of Bengali as one of the state languages of former East Pakistan. Shakrain Festival is an annual celebration observed with the flying of kites. It is usually observed in the old part of the city at the end of Poush, the ninth month of the Bengali calendar (14 or 15 January in the Gregorian calendar).

==== Religious Festivals ====
The Islamic festivals of Eid ul-Fitr, Eid ul-Adha, Eid-E-Miladunnabi and Muharram; the Hindu festival of Durga Puja; the Buddhist festival of Buddha Purnima; and the Christian festival of Christmas witness widespread celebrations across the city.

=== Music ===
The popularity of music groups and rock bands such as Warfaze, Shironamhin, Artcell and other solo artists such as Aryan Chowdhary, Ayub Bachchu, and Shafin Ahmed is growing day by day among the newer generations of Dhaka. Despite this, traditional folk music remains widely popular. The works of the national poet Kazi Nazrul Islam, national anthem writer Rabindranath Tagore and mystic saint songwriter Lalon have a widespread following across Dhaka. Bailey Road is known as natak para (drama neighbourhood) for its two theatre halls.

Mausoleum of Kazi Nazrul Islam

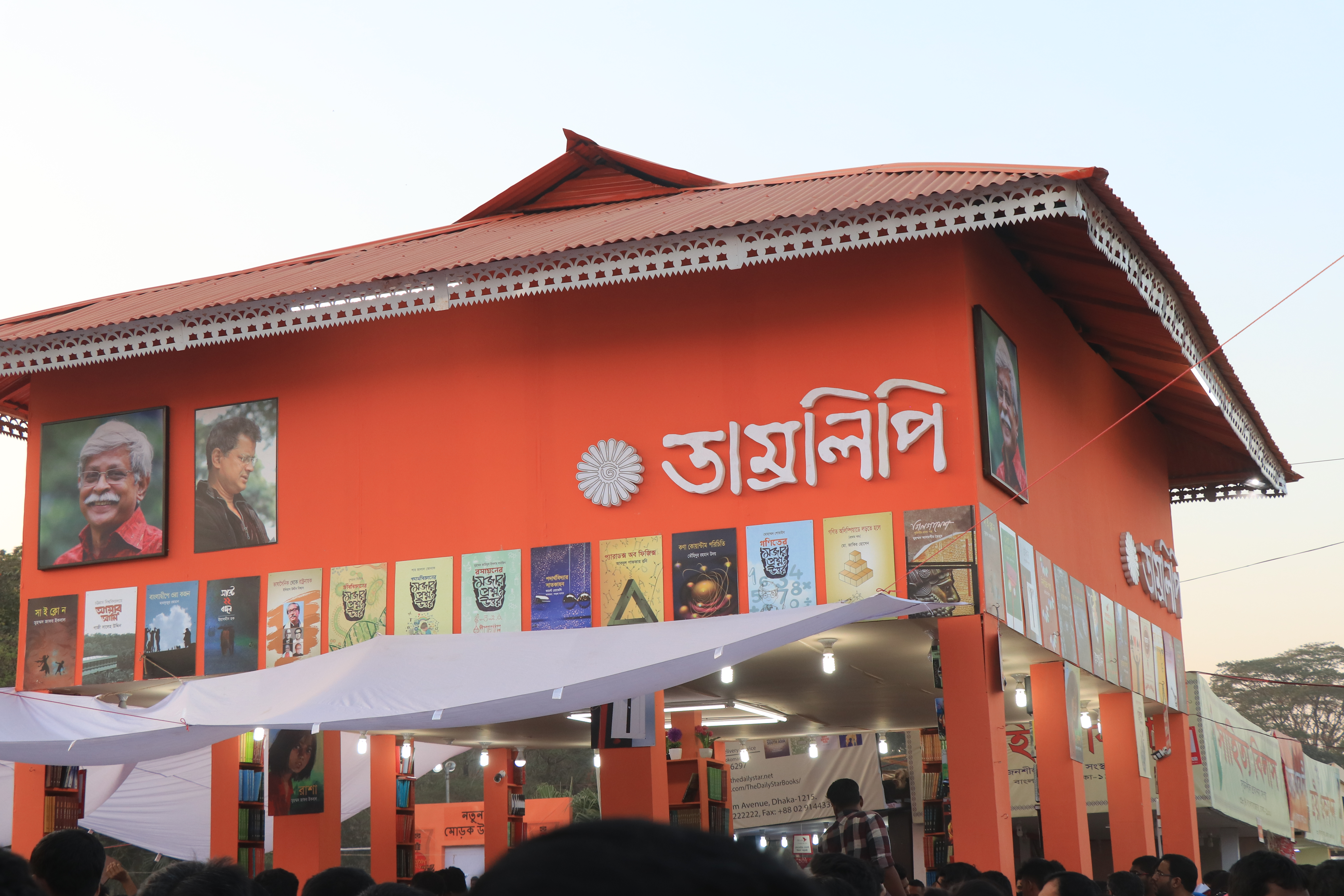
A Bengali book stall at the Ekushey Book Fair

=== Cultural institutions ===
- Bengal Foundation
- Chhayanaut
- Institute of Fine Arts
- Nazrul Institute
- Samdani Art Foundation
- Shilpakala Academy

=== Annual and biennial cultural events ===
- Bengal Classical Music Festival
- Chobi Mela International Photography Festival
- Dhaka Art Summit
- Dhaka Lit Fest
- Dhaka World Music Festival
- Dhaka International Book Fair
- Dhaka International Trade Fair
- Ekushey Book Fair

=== Rickshaw paintings ===
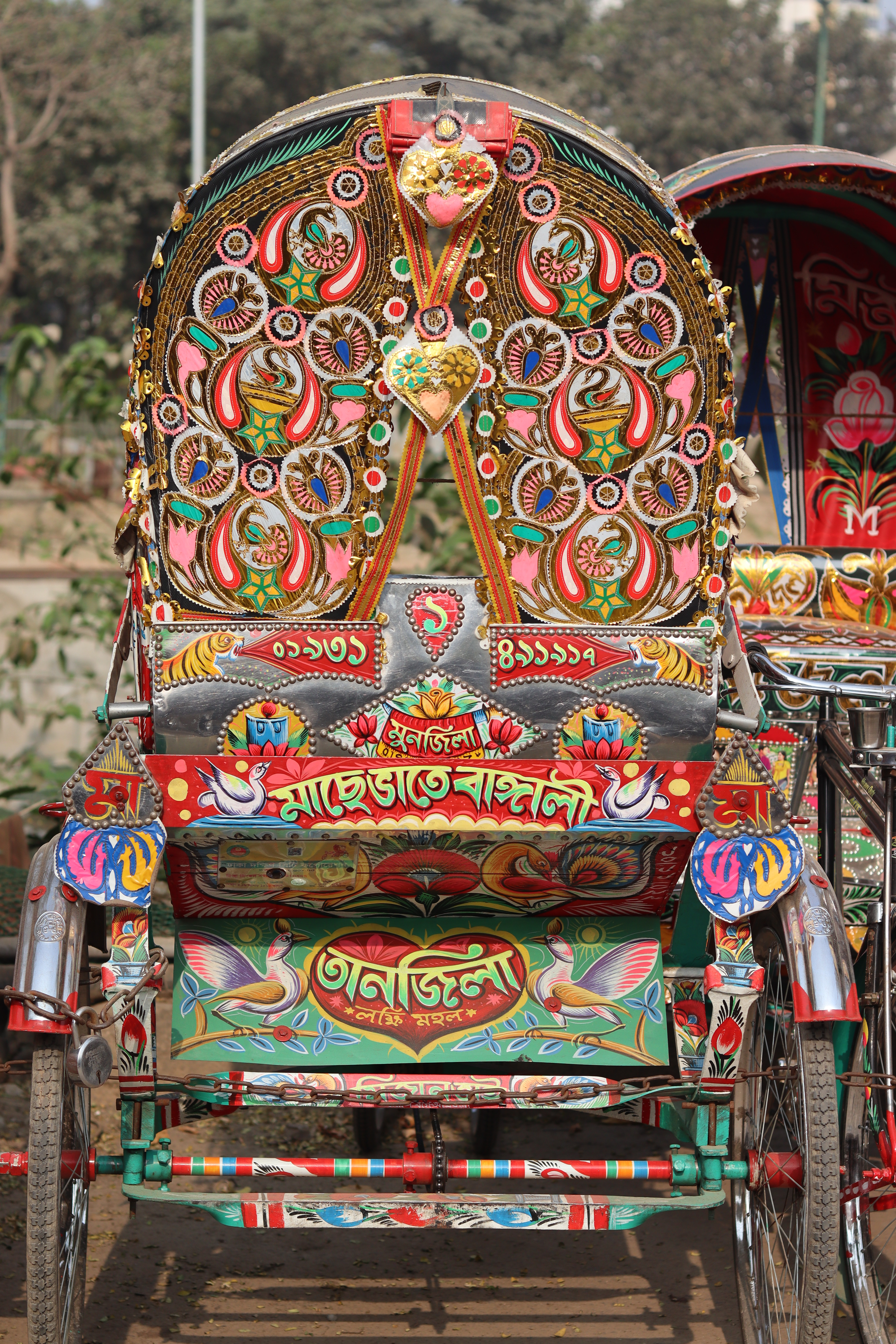
Rickshaw art

Rickshaws have become a symbol of the city. Rickshaws are colourfully painted with floral patterns and depictions of birds, animals, movie stars, religious text, historical events and national heroes. According to UNESCO, "Rickshaws and rickshaw painting are viewed as a key part of the city's cultural tradition and a dynamic form of urban folk art".

=== Cuisine ===
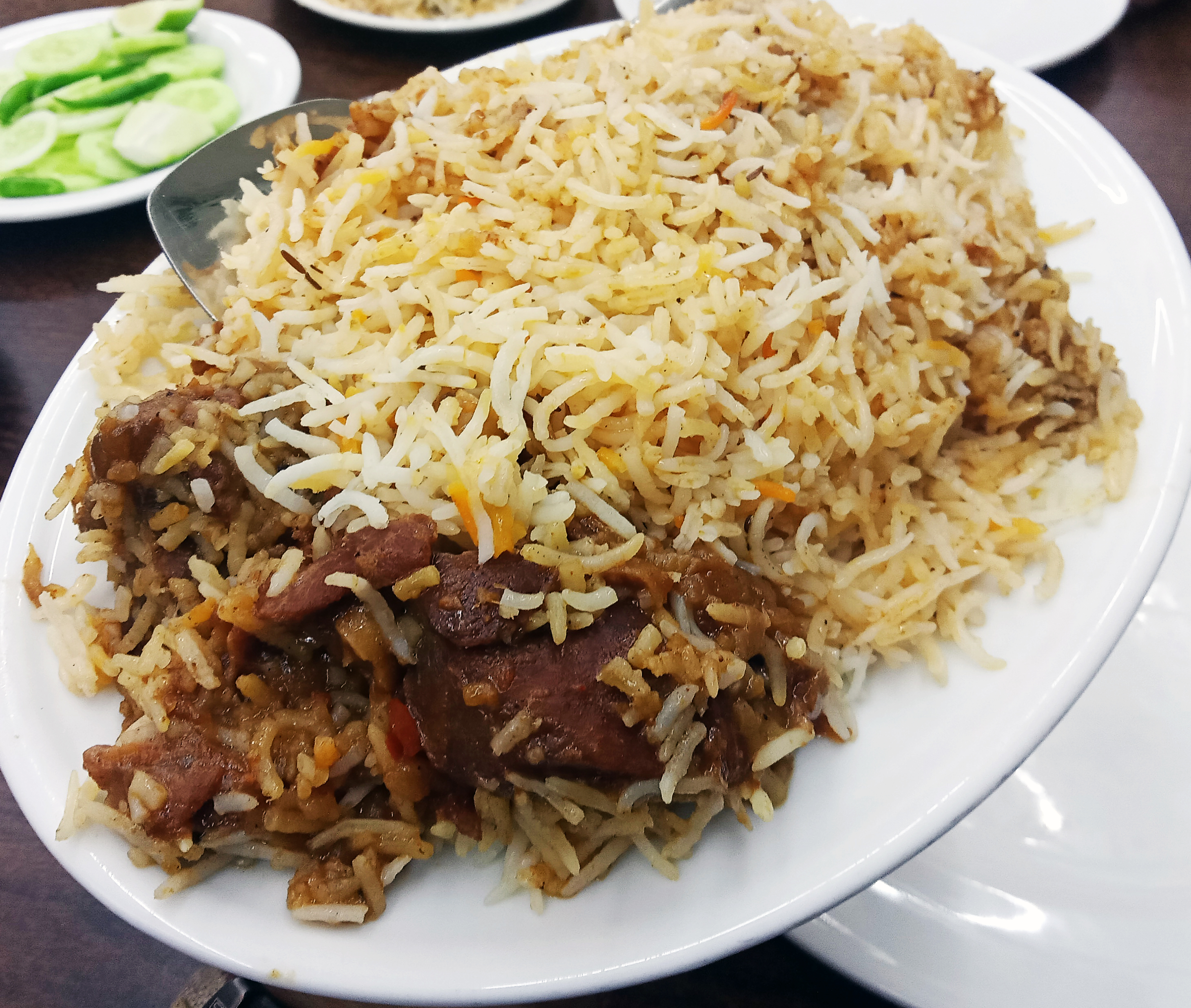
Dhaka has a renowned style of mutton (goat meat) and potato biryani, known as the Kacchi Biryani.

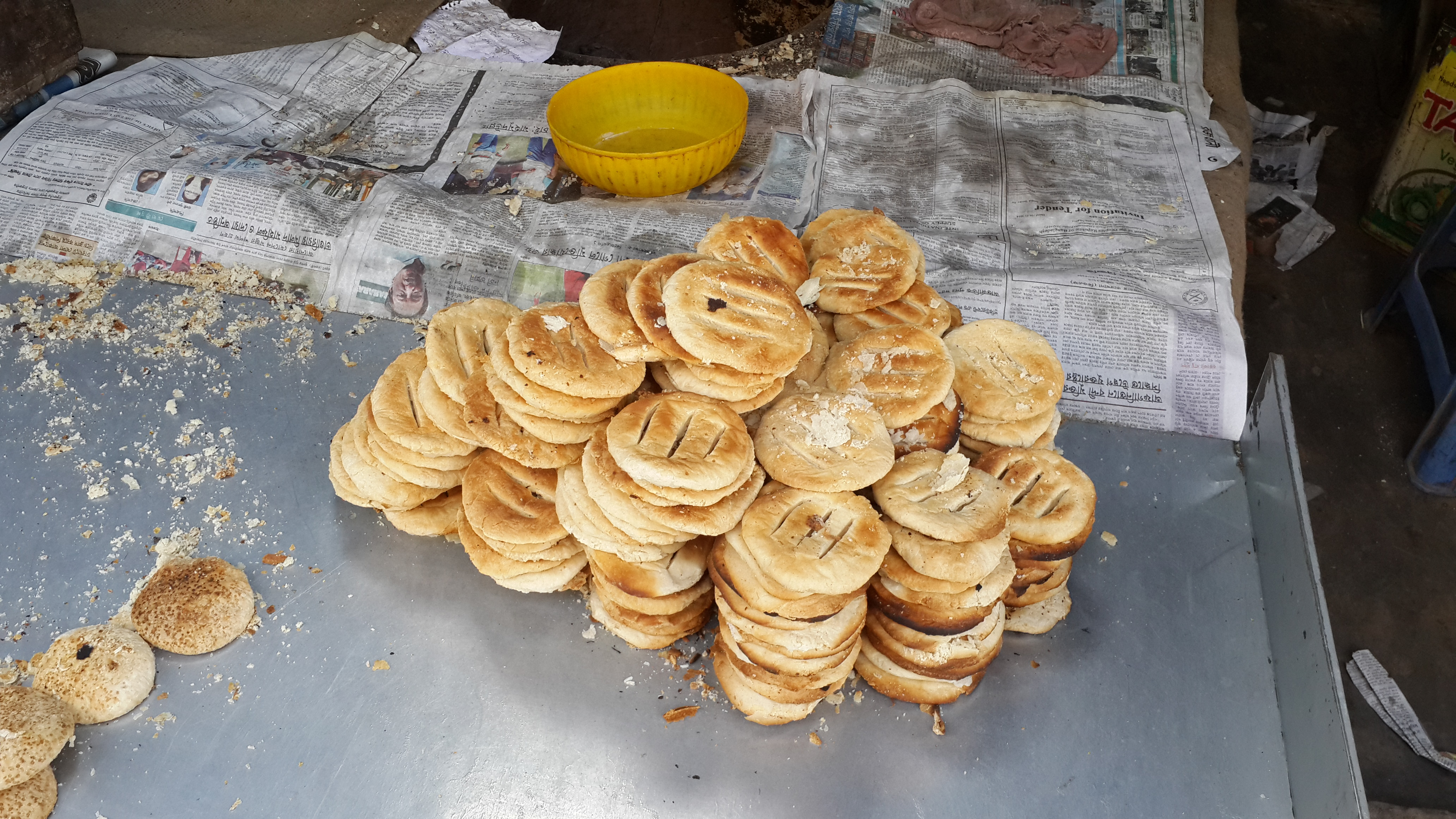
Bakarkhani is a snack item mostly eaten in old Dhaka

Historically, Dhaka has been the culinary capital of Bengal for Muslim cuisine, particularly Mughlai cuisine. Restaurants in the city serve several types of biryani, including Kacchi Biryani (goat meat), Tehari (beef), Murag Pulao (chicken), and Ilish Pulao (ilish fish). Khichuri rice is a popular comfort food. A distinct variant of Bengali-Mughlai cuisine evolved in the city. Like other Mughal cities, a special tradition exists to eat nihari beef stew during breakfast. In Dhaka, the nihari stew can be eaten with Bengali breads. Chefs from Dhaka, the former Mughal provincial capital, served in the kitchens of the Nawabs of Dhaka and Murshidabad. They invented the Kacchi Biryani, which is a variant of biryani with mutton steaks and potatoes. One of the longest surviving outlets serving authentic Kacchi Biryani is Fakhruddin's. Kacchi Biryani is highly popular in Bangladeshi cuisine, with food critic and former MasterChef Australia judge Matt Preston praising its use of potatoes. Borhani is served as a drink alongside biryani. The Nawabi cuisine of Dhaka was notable for its patishapta dessert and the Kubali pulao. The korma recipe of the Nawab family was included by Madhur Jaffrey in her cookbook "Madhur Jaffrey's Ultimate Curry Bible". Bakarkhani breads from Dhaka were served in the courts of Mughal rulers.

Since 1939, Haji biryani has been a leading biryani restaurant in the city. Dhaka also has a style of Murag Pulao (chicken biryani) which uses turmeric and malai (cream of milk) together. Local kebabs are widely eaten when dining out. The seekh kebab and chicken tikka are the most popular dishes in kebab restaurants, which are eaten with either naan or paratha. Liver is often eaten with breads, as a stuffing, or as a curry. Star Kabab is the most popular kebab chain in the city, alongside other chains and gourmet restaurants. Different kinds of bhurta, which refers to mashed vegetables, are widely eaten. Various types of Bengali fish curry are found in the city. Along with South Asian cuisine, a large variety of Western and Chinese cuisine is served at numerous restaurants and food courts. Upmarket areas include many Thai, Japanese and Korean restaurants. Italian food is also very popular in Dhaka, especially in upmarket areas.

During Ramadan, Chowkbazar becomes a busy marketplace for iftar items. The jilapi of Dhaka are much thicker than counterparts in India and Pakistan. The Shahi jilapi (king's jilapi) is one of the thickest jilapi produced. The phuchka and jhalmuri are popular street food. Dhaka hosts an array of Bengali dessert chains that sell a wide variety of sweets. Samosas and shingaras are also widely eaten traditional snacks. In recent years, the number of Bangladeshi-owned burger outlets has increased across the city. Notable bakeries include the Prince of Wales bakery in Old Dhaka and the Cooper's chain.

=== Architecture ===
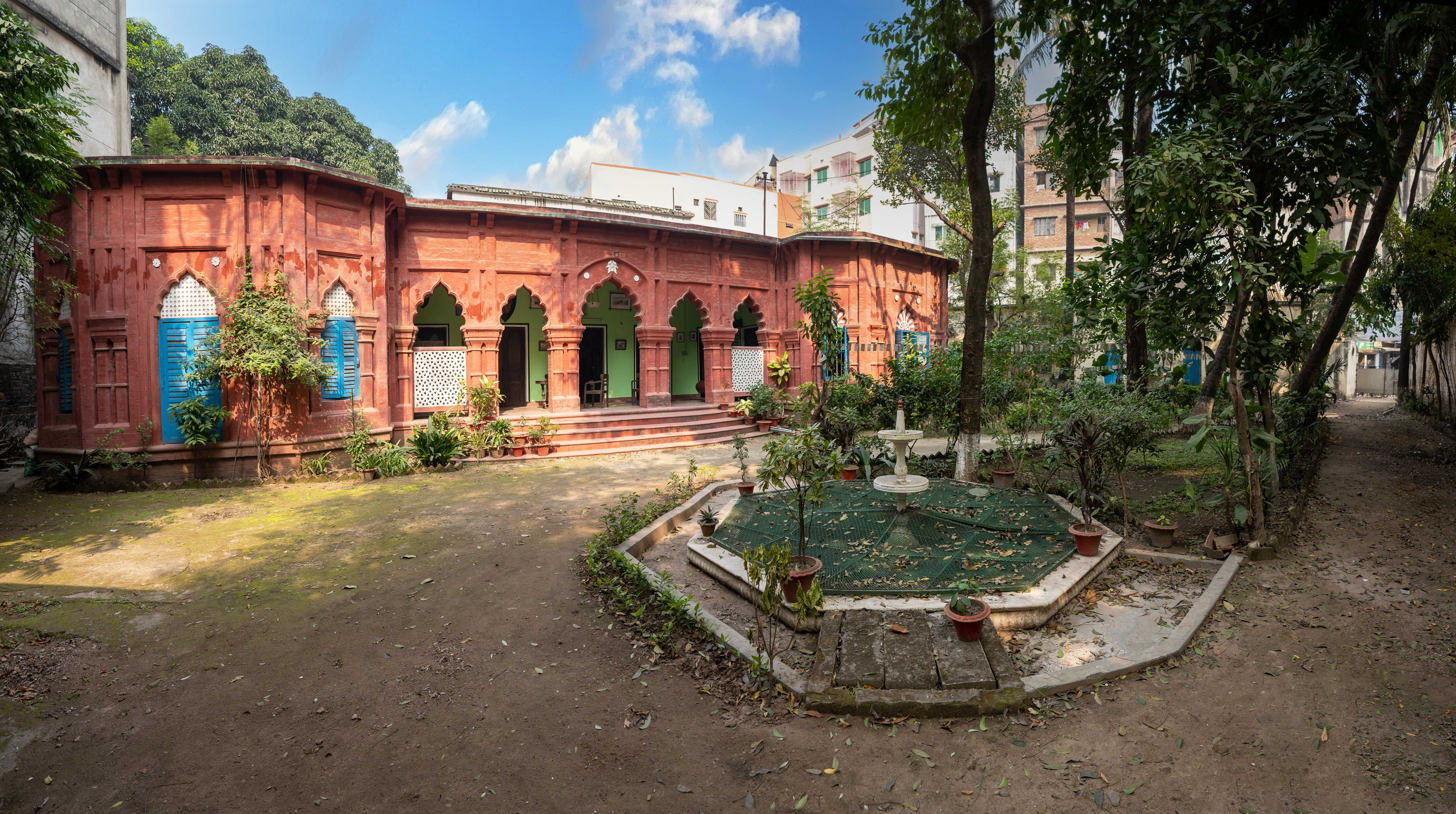
Haturia House was built in the Anglo-Mughal style in 1920

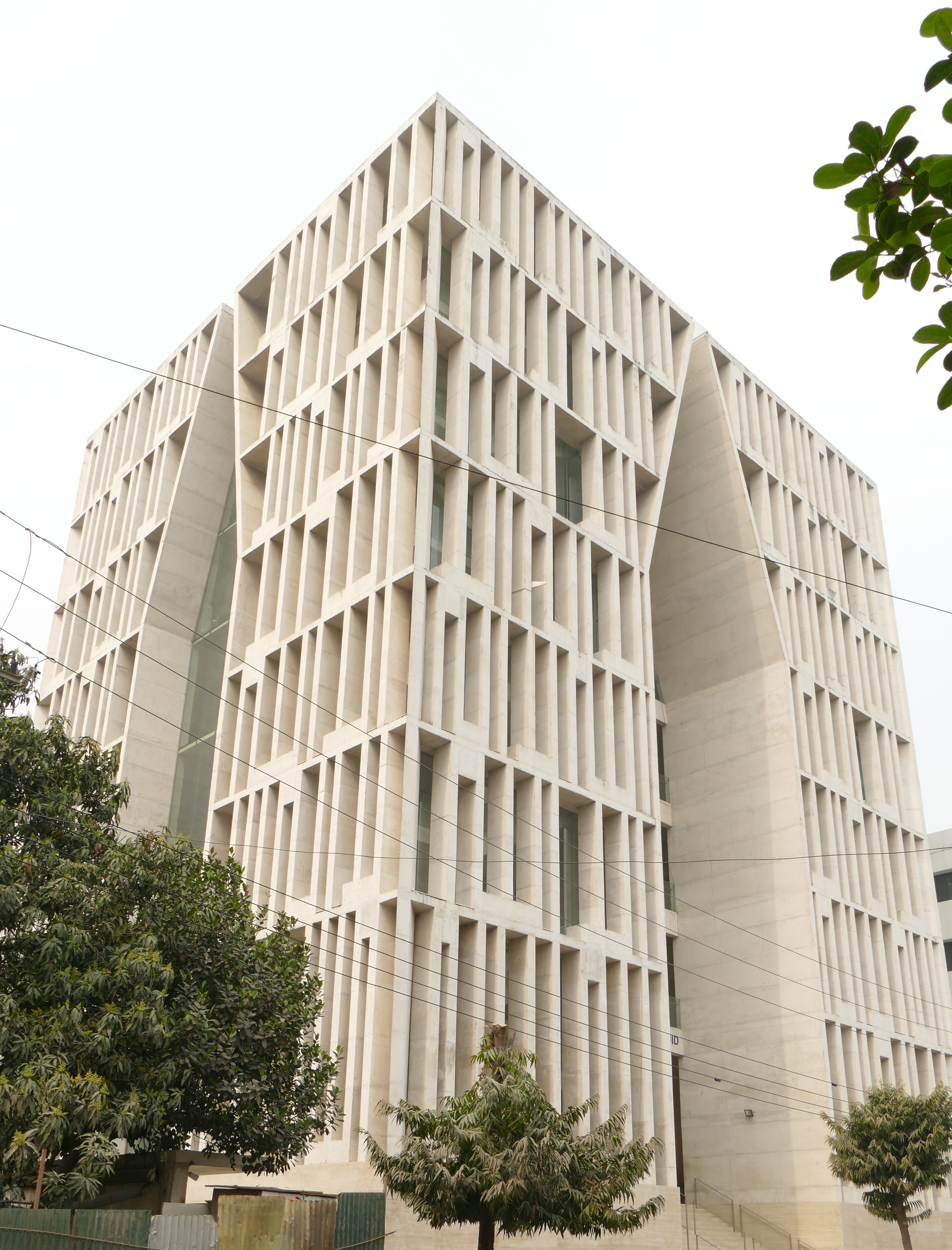
Gulshan Society Mosque was built in the modernist style in 2017

The architectural history of Dhaka can be subdivided into the Mughal, British, and modern periods. As a result, Dhaka has landmarks of Mughal architecture, Indo-Saracenic architecture, and modernist architecture. The oldest brick structure in the city is the Binat Bibi Mosque, which was built in 1454 in the Narinda area of Dhaka during the reign of the Sultan Nasiruddin Mahmud Shah (r. 1435 – 1459) of the Bengal Sultanate. Old Dhaka is home to over 2000 buildings built between the 16th and 19th centuries, which form an integral part of Dhaka's cultural heritage. Modern Dhaka is often criticized as a concrete jungle.

In the old part of the city, the fading grandeur of the Mughal era is evident in the crumbling, neglected caravanserai like Bara Katra and Choto Katra. Some structures like the Nimtali arch have been restored. The old city features narrow alleyways with high-walled lanes and houses with indoor courtyards. The early 20th century government quarter in Ramna includes stately colonial buildings set amidst gardens and parks. Among colonial buildings, the Curzon Hall stands out for "synthesizing imperial grandiosity with sporadic Mughal motifs".

Amongst modernist buildings, the Grameenphone headquarters is described as "a paradigm setter for corporate Bangladesh". The Museum of Independence and its attached national monument were inspired by the "land-water mysticism of deltaic Bengal" and the "evocative expansiveness of a Roman forum or the geographical assemblage of an Egyptian mastaba sanctuary". Dhaka's Art Institute, designed by Muzharul Islam, was the pioneering building of Bengali regional modernism. The vast expanse of the national parliament complex was designed by Louis Kahn. It is celebrated as Dhaka's pre-eminent civic space. The national parliament complex comprises 200 acres (800,000 m^{2}) in the heart of the city. The Kamalapur railway station was designed by American architect Robert Boughey. In the last few decades, Bangladesh's new wave of cultural architecture has been influenced by Bengali aesthetics and the environment. City Centre Bangladesh is currently the tallest building in the city.

=== Publishing and media ===
In 1849, the Katra Press became the first printing press in the city. The name alludes to the katra, the Bengali word for caravanserai. In 1856, Dacca News became the first English-language newspaper in the city. The Dacca News Press was the first commercial printing press in the city. Books published in Dhaka stirred discourse in the social and literary circles of Bengal. The Bengal Library Catalogue records the expansion of the publishing industry during the 1860s. Between 1877 and 1895, there were 45 printing presses in Dhaka. Between 1863 and 1900, more than a hundred Islamic puthi were published in Dhaka. Bookshops sprang up in Chowkbazar, Islampur, Mughaltuli, and Patuatuli. Albert Library was a den for left-wing activists. After partition, the number of publishing houses in Dhaka rose from 27 in 1947 to 88 in 1966. Prominent bookshops included Wheeler's Bookstall and Presidency Library. Banglabazaar has since become the hub of the book trade. Bookworm is a famous local book shop that has been located adjacent to the Prime Minister's Office for three decades until being ordered to relocate in 2022; it is now located in Justice Shahabuddin Ahmed Park.

Dhaka is the centre of the national media in Bangladesh. It is home to the state-owned Bangladesh Television and Bangladesh Betar. In recent years, the number of privately owned television channels and radio stations has increased greatly. There are over two dozen Bengali language television channels in the private sector, including 24-hour news channels. Radio is also popular across the city. Dhaka is home to national newspapers, including Bengali newspapers like Prothom Alo, Ittefaq, Inqilab, Janakantha, and Jugantor; as well as English language newspapers The Daily Star, The Financial Express, The Business Standard, Dhaka Tribune, and New Age. Broadcast media based in Dhaka include Channel 24, Banglavision, DBC News, Somoy TV, BTV and Ekattor.

== Education and research ==
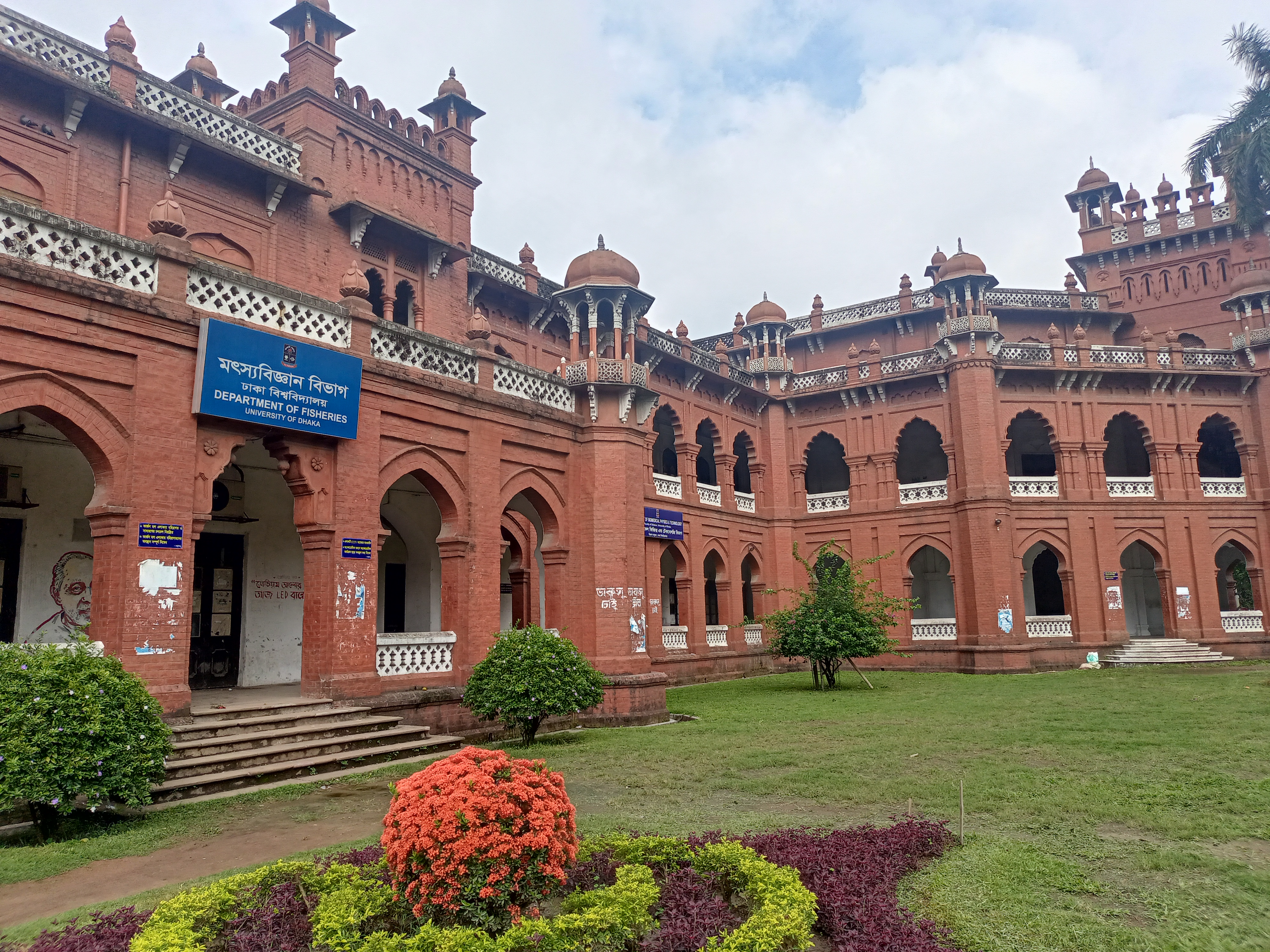
Curzon Hall is the home of the Faculty of Science, Dhaka University

Dhaka has the largest number of schools, colleges and universities of any Bangladeshi city. The education system is divided into five levels: primary (from grades 1 to 5), junior (from grades 6 to 8), secondary (from grades 9 to 10), higher secondary (from grades 11 to 12) and tertiary. The five years of primary education concludes with a Primary School Completion (PSC) Examination, the three years of junior education concludes with Junior School Certificate (JSC) Examination. Next, two years of secondary education concludes with a Secondary School Certificate (SSC) Examination. Students who pass this examination proceed to two years of higher secondary or intermediate training, which culminate in a Higher Secondary School Certificate (HSC) Examination. Education is mainly offered in Bengali. However, English is also widely taught and used. Many Muslim families send their children to attend part-time courses or even to pursue full-time religious education alongside other subjects, which is imparted in Bengali and Arabic in schools, colleges and madrasas.

There are 52 universities in Dhaka. Dhaka College is the oldest institution for higher education in the city and among the earliest established in British India, founded in 1841. Since independence, Dhaka has seen the establishment of numerous public and private colleges and universities that offer undergraduate and graduate degrees as well as a variety of doctoral programs. The University of Dhaka is the oldest public university in the country which has more than 30,000 students and 1,800 faculty staff. It was established in 1921 being the first university in the region. The university has 23 research centres and 70 departments, faculties, and institutes. Eminent seats of higher education include Bangladesh University of Engineering and Technology (BUET), Bangladesh Medical University (BMU), Jagannath University, Dhaka Central University (DCU) and Sher-e-Bangla Agricultural University. Bangladesh University of Professionals (BUP), situated in Mirpur Cantonment, is the largest public university affiliated with the armed forces. Dhaka Medical College is one of the oldest and largest medical colleges in the country. Founded in 1875, the Dhaka Medical School was the first medical school in British East Bengal, which became Sir Salimullah Medical College in 1962. Other government medical colleges are Shaheed Suhrawardy Medical College, Mugda Medical College and Armed Forces Medical College, Dhaka.

Two Nobel laureates are prominently associated with the city, including Amartya Sen who grew up in the city during the 1930s and 1940s, and attended St. Gregory's School; and Muhammad Yunus, who studied at Dhaka University, founded the Grameen Bank and lives in the city.

=== Learned societies and think tanks ===
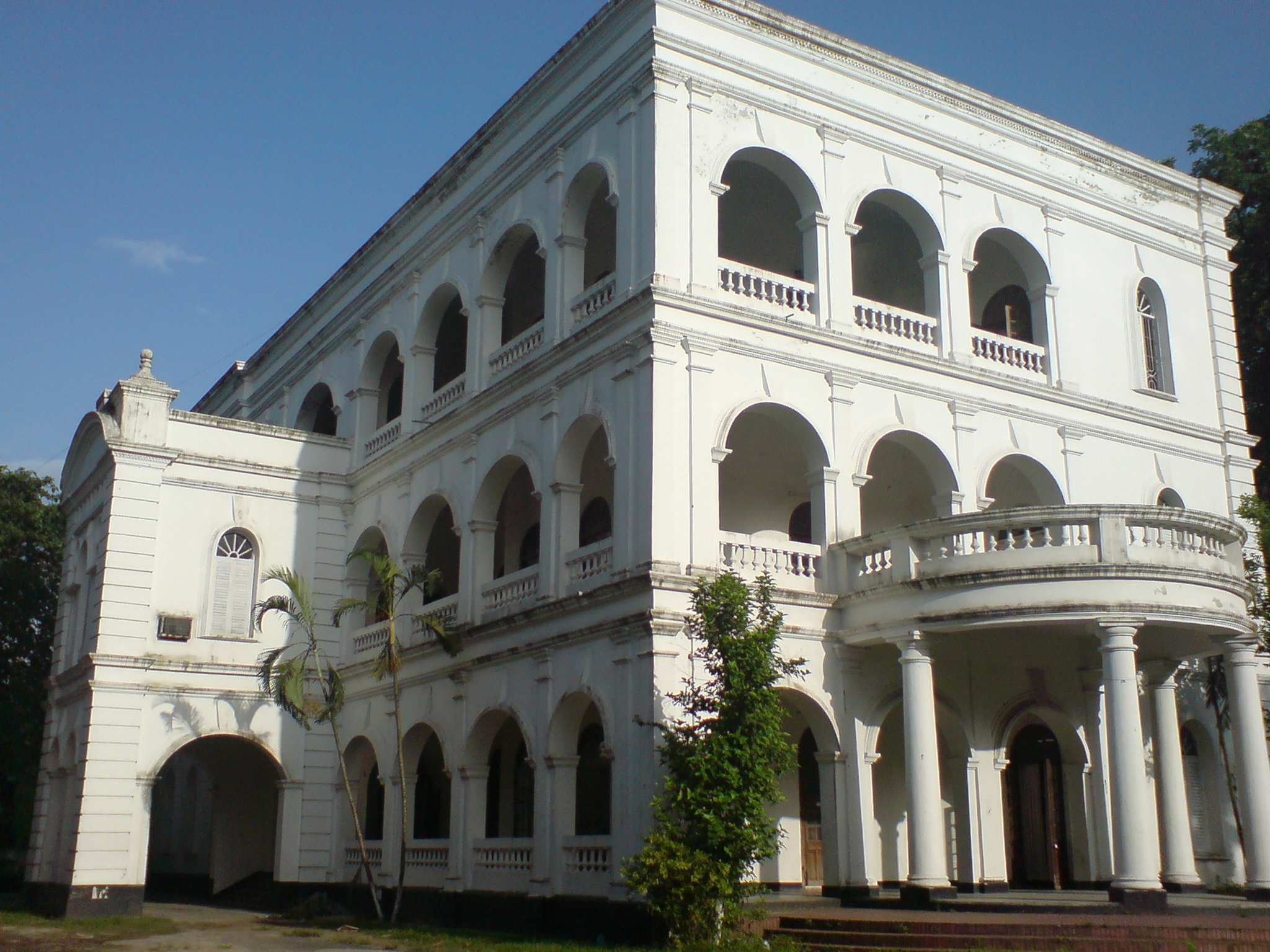
The Bangla Academy

- Asiatic Society of Bangladesh
- Atomic Energy Centre, Dhaka
- Bangla Academy
- Bangladesh Academy of Sciences
- Bangladesh Enterprise Institute
- Bangladesh Institute of Development Studies
- Bangladesh Centre for Advanced Studies
- Bangladesh Institute of Law and International Affairs
- Bangladesh Institute of Peace & Security Studies
- Centre for Policy Dialogue
- Centre on Integrated Rural Development for Asia and the Pacific
- International Centre for Diarrhoeal Disease Research, Bangladesh
- International Jute Study Group
- Space Research and Remote Sensing Organization
- Yunus Centre

== Sports ==
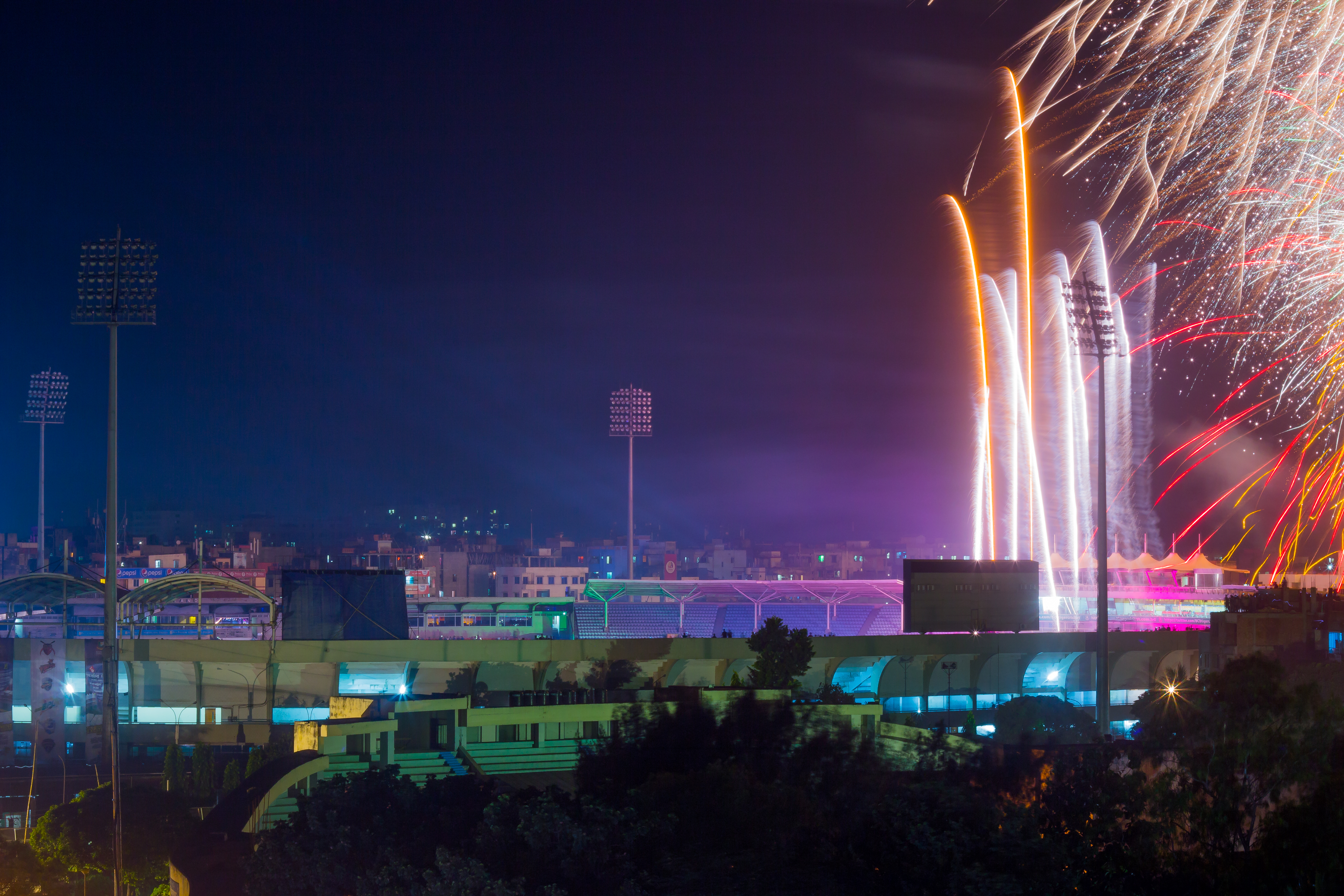
Fireworks at the launch of a Bangladesh Premier League season at the Sher-e-Bangla National Cricket Stadium

Cricket and football are the two most popular sports in Dhaka and across the nation. Teams are fielded in intra-city and national competitions by many schools, colleges and private entities. The Dhaka Metropolis cricket team represents Dhaka City in the National Cricket League, the oldest domestic first-class cricket competition in Bangladesh. The Dhaka Premier League is the only domestic List A cricket tournament now in Bangladesh. It gained List A status in 2013–14 season. In domestic Twenty20 cricket, Dhaka has a Bangladesh Premier League franchise known as Dhaka Capitals.

Dhaka has the distinction of having hosted the first official Test cricket match of the Pakistan cricket team in 1954 against India. The National Stadium, Dhaka was formerly the main venue for domestic and international cricket matches, but now exclusively hosts football matches. It hosted the opening ceremony of the 2011 Cricket World Cup, while the Sher-e-Bangla National Cricket Stadium, exclusively used for cricket, hosted 6 matches of the tournament including two quarter-final matches. Dhaka has also hosted the South Asian Games three times, in 1985, 1993 and 2010. Dhaka is the first city to host the games three times. The National Stadium was the main venue for all three editions. Dhaka also hosted the ICC Men's T20 World Cup, along with Chittagong and Sylhet, in 2014.

In football, the Dhaka Derby between Dhaka Mohammedan and Dhaka Abahani is the biggest sports rivalry in the country. The two clubs have maintained their fierce rivalry over the years in the Bangladesh Football League and previously in the historic Dhaka Football League, one of the oldest football leagues on the continent, operating since at least 1911. The National Stadium in Dhaka has been the home venue for the national football team since 2005. It has hosted the SAFF Championship on three occasions, with the first being the 2003 edition, which Bangladesh went on to win. The 1978 AFC Youth Championship was the first major international tournament hosted by the stadium.

The National Sports Council, responsible for promoting sports activities across the nation, is based in Dhaka. Dhaka also has stadiums largely used for domestic events such as the Bangladesh Army Stadium, the Bir Sherestha Shaheed Shipahi Mostafa Kamal Stadium, the Dhanmondi Cricket Stadium, the Maulana Bhasani Hockey Stadium and the Outer Stadium Ground. The city's colleges and universities are active in intercollegiate athletics.

There are two golf courses in Dhaka, Army Golf Club and Kurmitola Golf Club.

== Twin towns – sister cities ==
- Kolkata, India
- New York City, United States
- Guangzhou, China
- Bucharest, Romania
- Lima, Peru
- São Paulo, Brazil

== See also ==
- List of districts and suburbs of Dhaka
- List of places of worship in Dhaka city
- List of largest cities
- List of metropolitan areas in Asia
- List of most expensive cities for expatriate employees
- List of urban agglomerations in Asia
- Mia Shaheb Moidan
- Minervarya dhaka
- Districts of Bangladesh
- Divisions of Bangladesh
- Upazila
