= Dhakaiyas =

Indo-Aryan cultural group

Old Dhakaiya
পুরান ঢাকাইয়া پرانا ڈھاکہ पुराना ढाकाइया
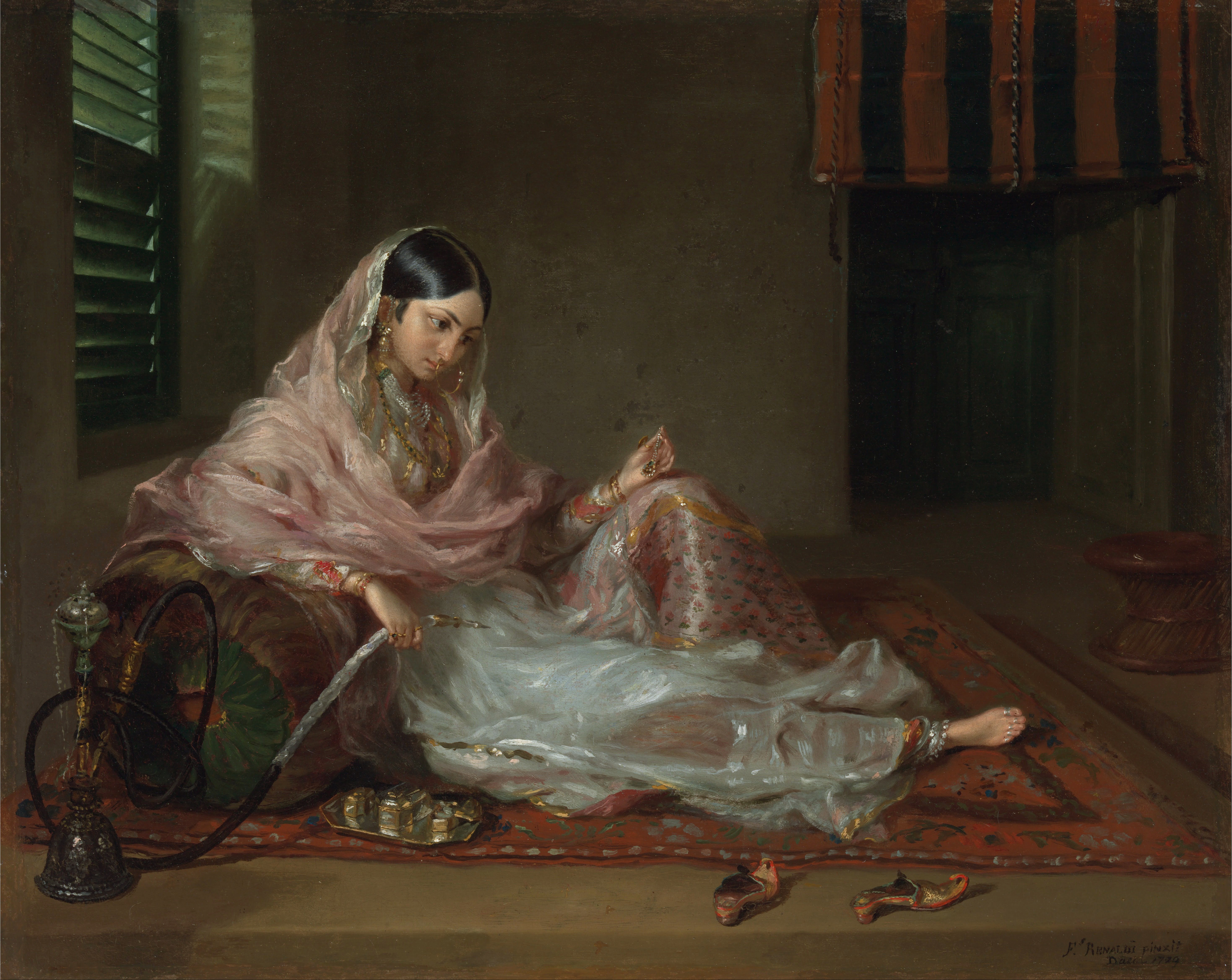
- A Dhakaiya Muslim lady in a muslin sari reclining with a hookah.

Regions with significant populations
- Old Dhaka (Bangladesh)

Languages
- Bengali (Dhakaiya Bengali, Dhakaiya Kutti Bengali), Urdu (Dhakaiya Urdu)

Religion
- Sunni Islam

Related ethnic groups
- Urdu-speaking people

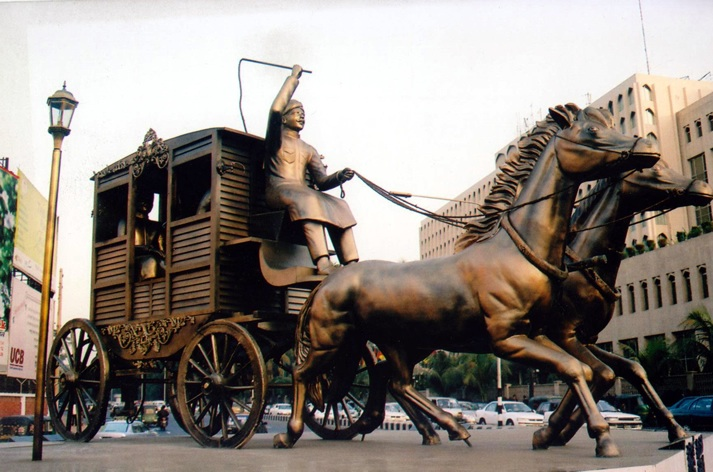
The Rajoshik sculpture, in front of the InterContinental Dhaka, displays a horse carriage and its driver.

The Old Dhakaiyas (Bengali: পুরান ঢাকাইয়া, romanized: Puran Dhakaiya) are a group of Indo-Aryan people, often viewed by some as the original inhabitants of Dhaka city. They are sometimes referred to as simply Dhakaiya. Their history dates back to the Mughal period with the migration of Bengali cultivators and foreign Muslim merchants to the city. The Bengali cultivators came to be known as Kutti and they speak Dhakaiya Kutti, a dialect of Bengali and the foreign Muslim merchants came to be known as Khoshbas and they speak Dhakaiya Urdu, a dialect of Urdu. Dhakaiya Kutti Bengalis have been described as a wealthy community of the Dhaka city. It is said that some people living in Greater Dhaka are even unaware of the existence of an Urdu-speaking non-Bihari minority community although their presence dates back centuries.

== History ==
=== Ancient ===
The Greater Dhaka region was under the kingdom of Vanga and Gangaridai in the early ancient period. Archaeological excavations in 2017–2018 inside the former Old Dhaka Central Jail on Nazimuddin Road in Old Dhaka revealed some glazed and rolled potteries that are similar to what were found in ancient Mahasthangarh and, Wari-Bateshwar ruins in Bangladesh, and other ruins in India, Malaysia, Indonesia, and Cambodia. This suggests Dhaka was inhabited at least from 500 BC to 200 BC.

=== Mughal period ===
ڈھاکہ عجیب شہر، نام جہانگیر نگر
Dhaka ajeeb shahar, naam Jahangir Nagar
Dhaka is a strange city, its name is Jahangirnagar
دو چار شریف ہے، باقی کٹّی تمام
Do-char Sharif hai, baaqi Kutti tamam
There are a few sharif (nobles), the rest are all Kutti

— Urdu stanza describing population ratio.

During the Mughal era, the Bengal Subah was famous for rice cultivation and the city of Jahangirnagar (now Old Dhaka) was the province's capital. Rice was a very important export product in the mid-eighteenth century, centred in Dhaka. The merchants who exported the rice were predominantly foreign Muslims of noble descent with Mughal, Turkic, Pathan or Central Asian ancestry. These merchants would go to different areas in Eastern Bengal and collect the rice. The rice was first needed to be cleaned up using dhekis before packaging, and this process is called kuta (কুটা) in Bengali. Many local Bengali rice cultivators from villages across Bengal were employed to do this. They would travel to the city to complete this job, and as it was lengthy journey, many of them started to permanently start residing in Dhaka. This migration took place circa 1760. However, not all were involved in the rice trade. The presence of the Mughals in Dhaka meant that there was generally a lot more employment opportunities there and so they took other occupations such as khansamahs, footsoldiers, guards, chefs and chauffeurs for the Nawabs of Dhaka and other aristocratic families. These groups of people lived together and engaged in conversations and addas with their Hindustani counterparts and their main occupation led them to be known as kuttis (other less-common names included kutiyal and hatkutti). The interactions of Kutti-Bengalis with different migrated north Indian Urdu-speaking people in Old Dhaka led to the birth of an Urdu-influenced dialect of Bengali known as Dhakaiya Kutti, and with that - a new identity.

The foreign Muslim merchants also eventually settled in Dhaka and came to be known as khoshbas meaning happily-settled. Other names for them included sukhbas and subbasi. Originally an Urdu-speaking community, their time in Bengal led to the emergence of a Bengali-influenced dialect known as Dhakaiya Urdu as they were a minority in comparison to the Kutti-Bengalis.

Many of the Kutti-Bengalis became a lot wealthier over the years due to their occupation and many became landowners. With thousands of Kutti being involved in the rice supplying industry by 1787, they also formed a merchant class by monopolising rice retail in the city. Notable landowners in New Paltan included Gulenur Khatun and Ayub Ali Sardar. Khatun owned a large portion of the northern part of New Paltan where she also owned a thatched hut residence as well as a tea stall. Named as Lalur Maar Dokan (লালুর মার দোকান, Lalu's mother's shop), it was located just beside the 3rd gate of the erstwhile East Pakistan Rifles. Sardar, who lived on the other side of Khatun's tea stall, was a horse operator and had a number of horses. These horses would engage in horse races in the famous Ramna Race Course, from which not only he made a fortune from, but also won medals from the British Raj. They can also be found in other localities such as Narinda.

=== Modern ===
Presently, the Kutti-Bengalis are minority in Old Dhaka following the mass migration of non-Dhakaite Bengalis from districts all over Bengal during the first and second partitions during the British colonial period. With the expansion of the city, new residential areas were created to supply housing to the more recent migrants. The traditional trade hub at Sadarghat was shifted to Nilkhet and Gulistan, decreasing Old Dhakaiya influence. The new educated migrant community (now also commonly known as Dhakaiyas with the former now being referred to as "Old Dhakaiyas") spoke in Standard Bengali, the standardised register of Bengali. Some of the Old Dhakaiya community began to see the new migrant community as their opponents due to these dialectal and cultural differences. This division was the source of modern troubles in the identities of the Old Dhakaiyas (who view themselves as original inhabitants) and the post-partition migrant community (who currently form the majority in the city).

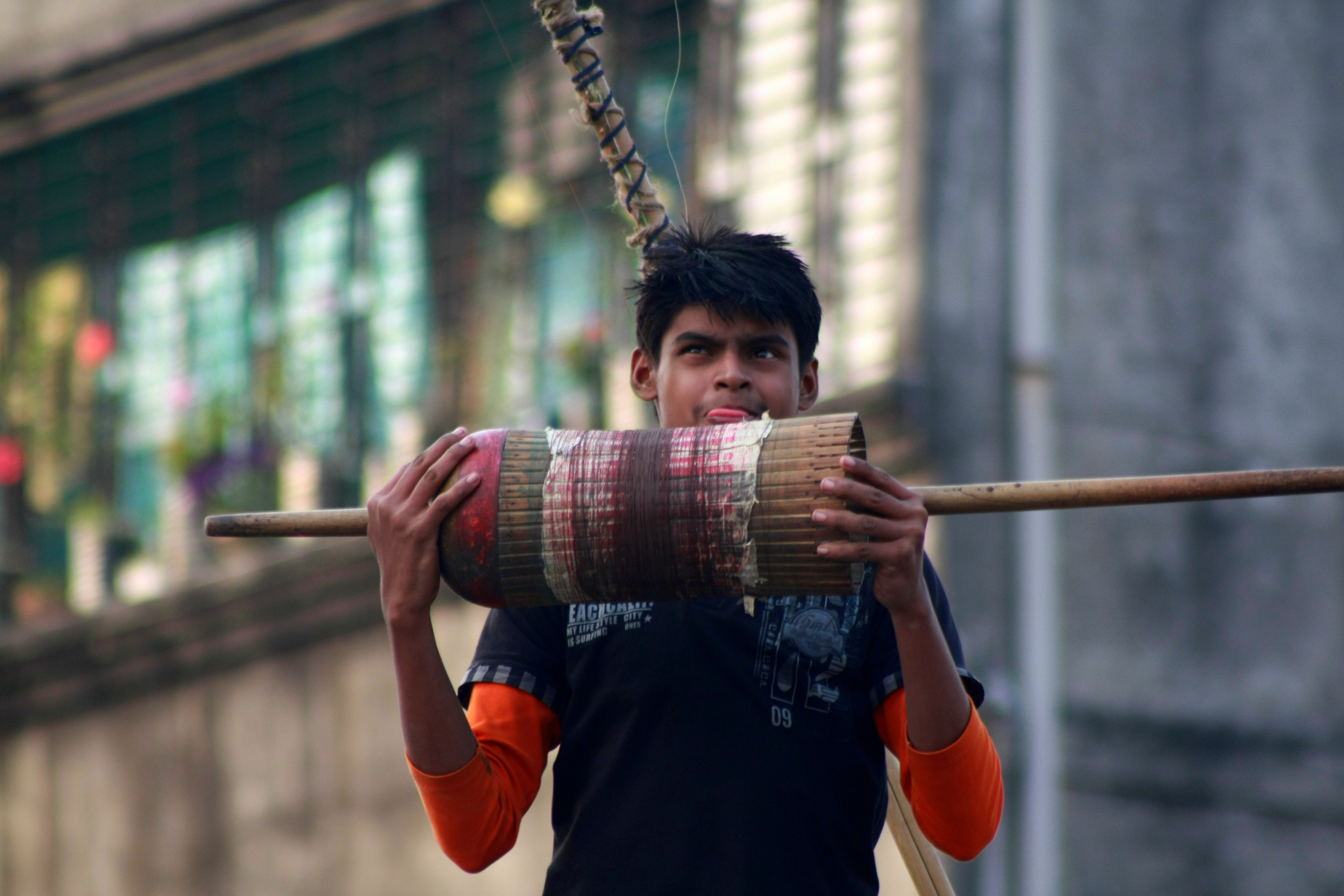
A young boy flying a kite in the Shakrain festival.

== Culture ==
=== Clothing ===
A common tradition of the Kutti-Bengalis was that they would wear white shirts and white lungis. The Khoshbas would dress very formally, sporting black sherwanis. Covering ones head in both communities is seen as more respectful, and notable headwear include the tupi, karakul, rumi topi and taqi. Women are famed for the Dhakai jamdani-sari, a clothing originating in Dhaka using a fine muslin textile. Dating back centuries, it is popular amongst Bengalis in general. The traditional art of weaving jamdani was patronised by the Mughals but under British colonial rule, the jamdani and muslin industries rapidly declined due to colonial import policies favouring industrially manufactured textiles. In more recent years, the production of jamdani has witnessed a revival in Bangladesh and in 2013, UNESCO classed it as an Intangible Cultural Heritage of Humanity. In 2016, Bangladesh received geographical indication (GI) status for the Jamdani Sari.

=== Cuisine ===
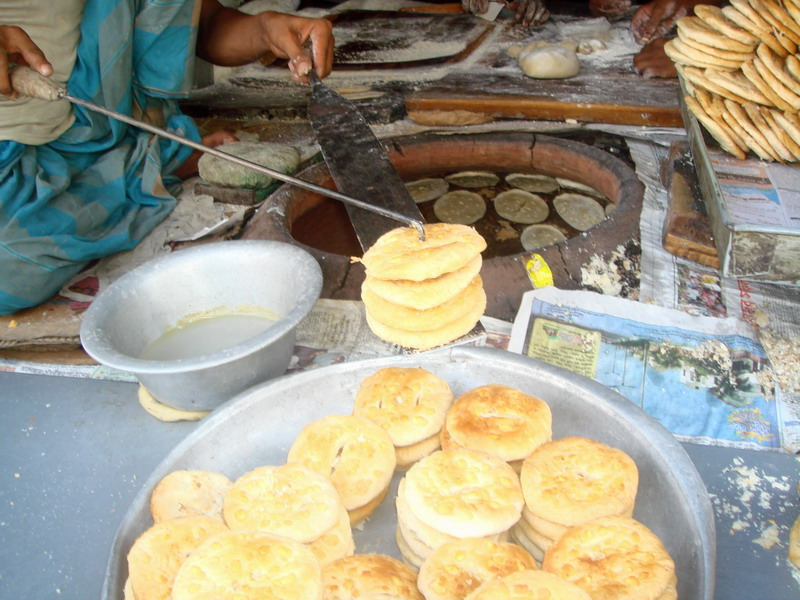
Bakarkhani being made in Dhaka, Bangladesh.

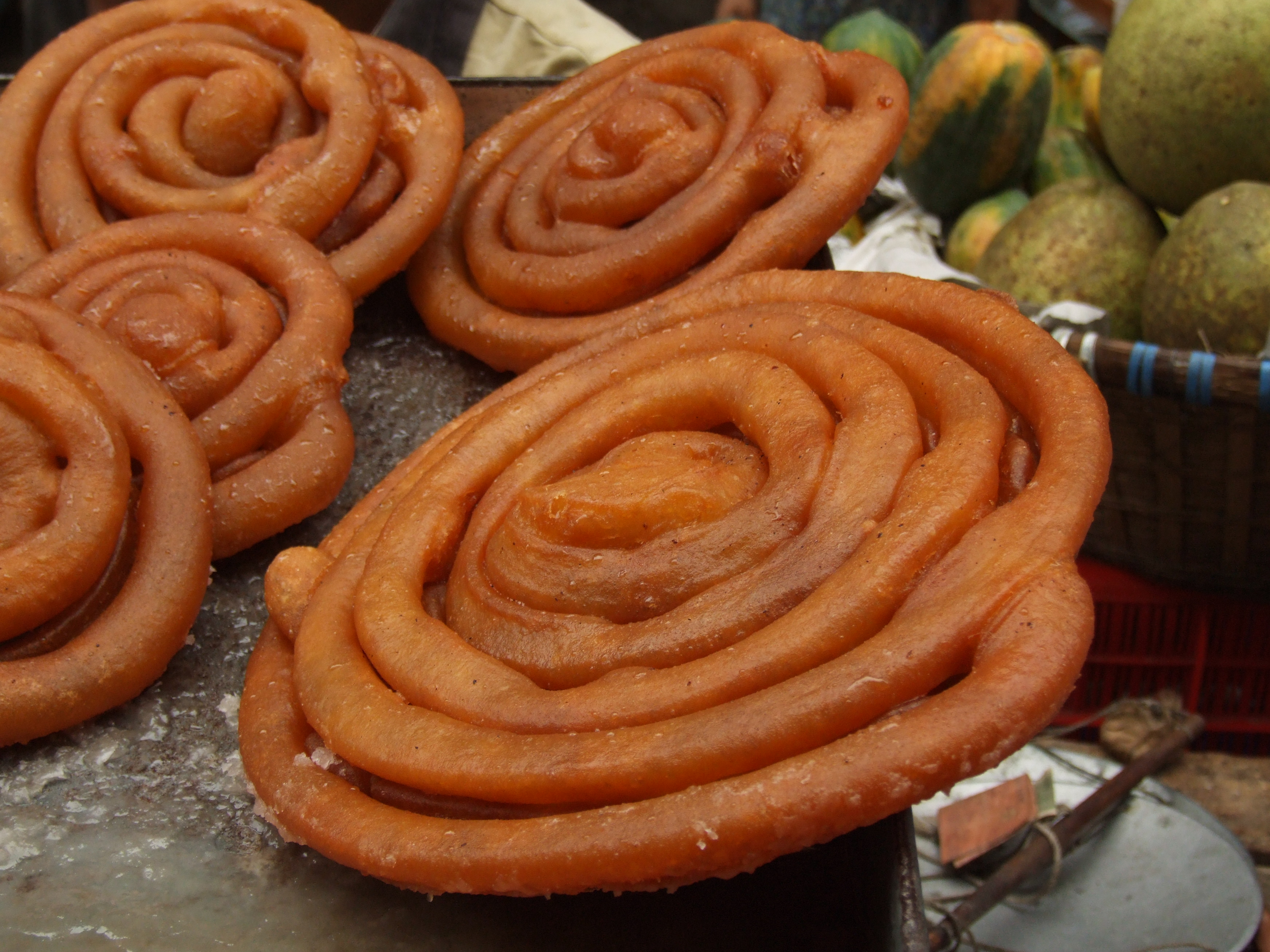
Shahi jilapi is a very popular sweetmeat in Ramadan

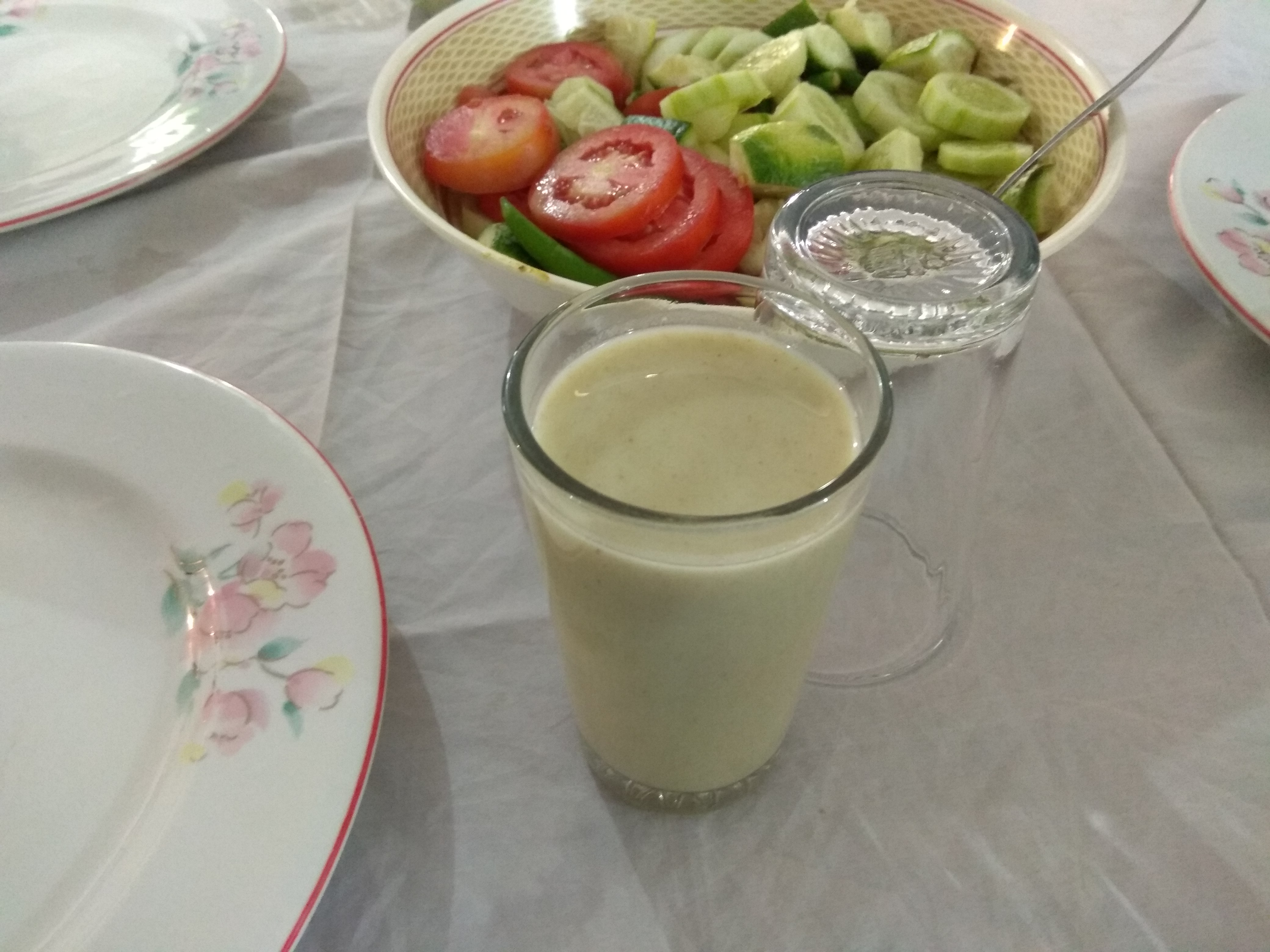
Cold borhani is drunk with hot meals

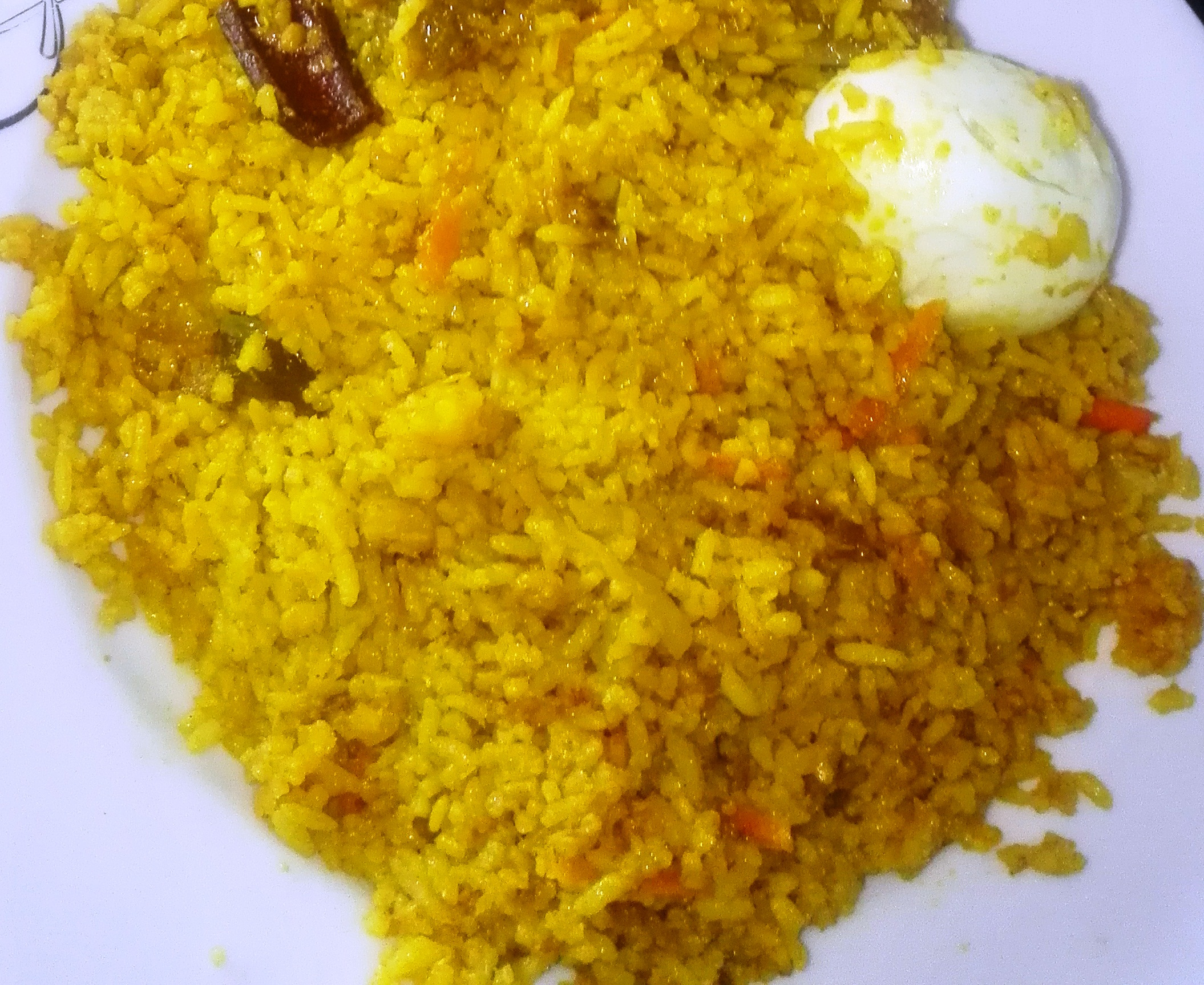
Khichuri is considered a rich gourmet delicacy.

Old Dhakaiya food is one of the most notable regional Bangladeshi cuisines. The rich culinary customs are influenced by Mughlai, Central Asian, Armenian, Hindustani and Bengali cuisines. However, it also has dishes unique to Dhaka. Haji biryani is a dish, invented by a restaurateur in 1939, made with highly seasoned rice, goat's meat and number of spices and nuts. The restaurant has become an integral part of Dhakaiya culture. Old Dhaka boasts a variation of the famous pilaf - the Morog Polao - in which the rice is cooked after and the chicken pieces are cut. Other polaos include ilish polao and rui polao. Dhakaiyas are noted for introducing paneer and boiled eggs to khichuri. Dhakai bakarkhani is a thick, biscuit-like flat-bread which is a traditional street-food snack, famed for its quality and taste. It is mainly dished up with tea. Old Dhakaiyas proudly hold a heritage of creating the best khili paan using various herbs and spices. They also offer a khili paan for diabetic patients called the "paan afsana". Common Dhakaiya beverages include borhani, Rooh Afza, shorbot, traditional fruit juices as well as basil seed-based drinks. Falooda, shahi jilapi and shemai are popular sweet foods and desserts.

=== Festivals ===
اٹھ تے ہیں پچھلے پھر رات کو کھا کر سحری
Uth te hain pichle pahar raat ko kha kar sehri
شوق سے رکھیو تو کل روزہ، میں تیرے واری
Shauq se rakhiyo tu kal roza, main tere vaari

— A common Urdu qasida recited in Ramadan

In the holy Islamic month of Ramadan, it was a custom for every household to send a food offering to their local mosque. A dostorkhan would be laid in the mosque for the fasting people to eat on. Chowk Bazaar was one of the most famous business and social meeting centres of Old Dhaka in the Mughal period and even today, during Ramadan, it is famous for the availability of hundreds of Iftar items. At the end of the month, Chowk Bazaar would host a two-day mela for the celebration of Eid al-Fitr. Popular toys and gifts, known as eidi, emerged in the Dhakaiya culture such as the bhotbhoti; a motor using kerosene that would spin around in water, as well as the drum-carriage. Hakim Habibur Rahman mentions in his book, Dhaka Panchas Baras Pahle (Dhaka, fifty years ago) that during sehri time (pre-dawn), groups of people would sing qasidas to wake up the neighbourhood. This tradition was patronised by the nawabs and sardars of Dhaka and on Eid day, the Chief Sardar would present awards and baksheesh to the best qasida singers. Qasidas were generally sung in Urdu but in the 1980s, Bengali qasidas also came into fashion. This tradition is experiencing a revival with the efforts from the likes of Shamsher Rahman of Posta. Qawwalis as well as Urdu poetry recital was very common amongst the Khoshbas in particular.

The Shakrain festival is an age-long Dhakaiya kiting tradition celebrating the arrival of winter in the Bengali calendar. Kite fighters would assemble in their rooftops, lighting up the skyline. Dhakaiya weddings are also typically seen as very "extravagant". Other sports that were popular amongst Old Dhakaiyas were hockey, horse riding and Nouka Baich (boat racing). The latter was originally practised in rural areas, but its popularity in urban areas increased in the 18th century as the Nawabs would organise many races.

=== Language ===
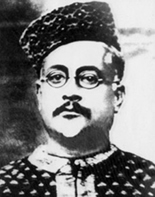
Hakim Habibur Rahman was the writer of the celebrated Urdu book Dhaka, Panchas Baras Pahle - a detailed history of Old Dhaka and its people, culture and traditions.

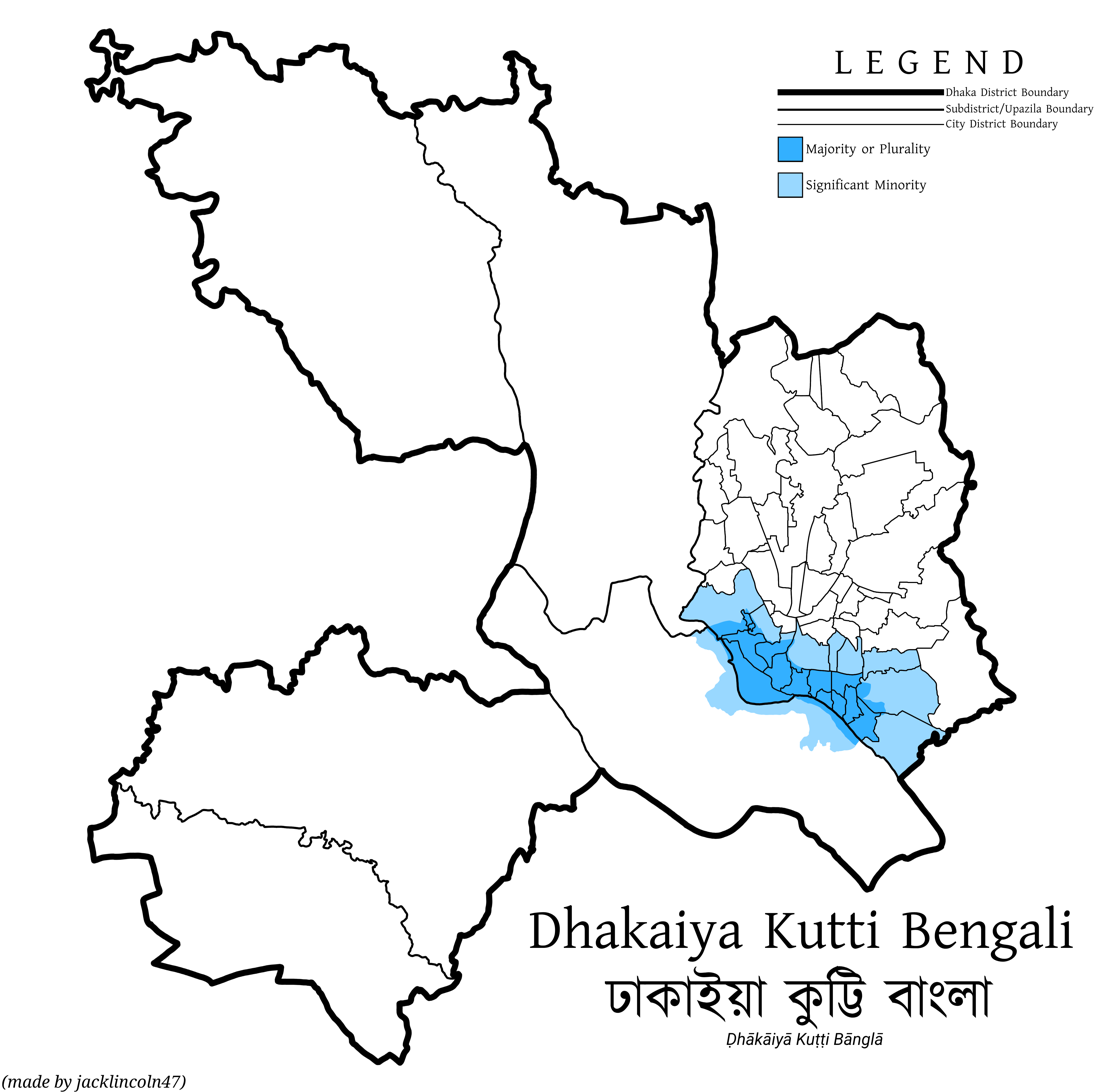
Map of the Dhaka District and the areas where the Dhakaiya Kutti Bengali dialect is spoken.

Two dialects of Bengali and Urdu emerged in Old Dhaka during the Mughal period due to the interactions between the Urdu and Bengali speakers. The Khoshbas and the Nawabs of Dhaka spoke a Bengali-influenced dialect of Urdu known as Dhakaiya Urdu (which is distinct to the Hindustani creole spoken by the Bihari community). The Kutti-Bengalis spoke Dhakaiya Kutti, a Bengali dialect with an Urdu influence. Humour is an important part of Kutti culture and in the past, their jokes - told in the Dhakaiya Kutti dialect - used to generally consist of short stories in which Dhakaiyas mess around with the bhadralok gentry. The Kuttis refer to outsiders or non-Dhakaiya Bengalis by the name "Gaiya" (গাঁইয়া), meaning from the village, and Kolkatans in particular as Demchi (ডেমচি).

Dhaka was also an esteemed centre for the study of Persian, as it was an official language up until the colonial period and due to the high population of merchants and businessman from Central Asia and Persia that settled in Dhaka. The Naib Nazim of Dhaka Nusrat Jang was known to have written a history book titled Tarikh-i-Nusrat Jangi around the late 18th century. Agha Ahmad Ali is considered to be the greatest among Persian scholars of Bengal, famed for his Persian lexicology works like Muayyid-i-Burhan and Shamsher-i-Teztar, rivalling contemporaries like Ghalib, and are still read today across South Asia. The Department of Persian at the University of Dhaka was opened in 1921.

== In media ==
In 2008, Ekushey Television launched a serial called "Tuntuni Villa" centred on an Old Dhakaite family. Shakib Khan played an Old Dhakaiya character in the 2015 Dhallywood film "Love Marriage".

== Notables ==
- Shamsur Rahman, Bengali poet, columnist and journalist
- Hakim Habibur Rahman, Unani physician, historian, editor of Al Mashriq (Dhaka's first Urdu newspaper)
- Agha Ahmad Ali, scholar of Persian and Urdu poet
- Bulbul Ahmed, actor and film director
- Sayeed Ahmed, playwright
- Muhammad Enamul Huq, CSP officer and Ex Establishment secretary of Bangladesh Government.

== See also ==
- Nawab of Dhaka, the largest erstwhile zamindari family in Bengal and Assam
- Biharis in Bangladesh, another Urdu-speaking community in Bangladesh
- Nassakh, Urdu poet of nearby Faridpur
- Mahifarash, Dhakaiya fishmonger community
