= Dhakaiya Urdu =

Dialect of the Urdu language used in Bangladesh

- ڈَھکَیّا اردو; ঢাকাইয়া উর্দু
- Region: Old Dhaka
- Ethnicity: Sobbasi/khosbasi
- Era: Late 18th century-present
- Language family: Indo-European: Indo-Iranian; Indo-Aryan; Central Zone; Western Hindi; Hindustani; Urdu; Dhakaiya Urdu
- Writing system: Bengali script Urdu alphabet

Language codes
- ISO 639-3: –
- IETF: ur-u-sd-bd13

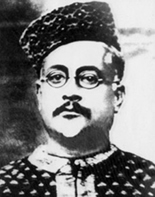
Hakim Habibur Rahman was one of the leading Urdu writers in Dhaka.

Dhakaiya Urdu is a Bengalinized variety of Urdu that is spoken in Old Dhaka, Bangladesh. It is currently spoken by the Sobbas or Khosbas community, Nawab Family and some other communities in Old Dhaka. The usage of this language is gradually declining due to negative perceptions following it being forced upon the people of erstwhile East Bengal during Bengali language movement in Pakistan. Today, Dhakaiya Urdu is one of the two dialects of Urdu spoken in Bangladesh; the other one being the Urdu spoken by the Stranded Pakistanis in Bangladesh.

== Features ==
The dialect differs from Standard Urdu as it takes several loanwords from Eastern Bengali, which the dialect's source of origin is geographically surrounded by. The intonations, aspirations and tone of this dialect are also shifted closer to Eastern Bengali than Hindustani phonology. It is described as a fairly simpler dialect than Standard Urdu.

| English | Standard Urdu | Dhakaiya Urdu | Eastern Bengali (Vangiya) |
|---|---|---|---|
| this | ye (یہ) | e (اے) | e (এ) |
| he | vo (وہ) | o (او) | o (ও) |
| too/also | bhī (بھی) | bī (بی) | -o (-ও) |
| very | bahot (بہت) | k͟hūb (خوب) | khub (খুব) |
| for what? | kis liye (کس لئے) | kā(h)e-ke liye (کاہے کے لئے) | kisher laiga (কিসের লাইগা) |
| help | madad (مدد) | sāhāijo (ساہائجو) | shahaijjo (সাহাইয্য) / môdod (মদদ) |
| understand | samajhnā (سمجھنا) | būjhnā (بُوجھنا) | bujha (বুঝা) |
| use | istamāl/istemāl (استعمال) | byabahār (بیَبَہار) | byabohār (ব্যবহার) / estemal (এস্তেমাল) |
| I | mein (میں) | hāmi (حامی) | āmi (আমি) |
| my/mine | merā (میرا) | hāmār (ہامار) | āmār (আমার) |

== Writing system ==
Dhakaiya Urdu currently does not have a standardised writing system, as it traditionally formed the diglossic vernacular, with standard Urdu forming the codified lect used for writing. Recently, Dhakaiya Urdu is being written in the Bengali script and also in Urdu Nastaliq script by organisations "Dhakaiya Movement", "Dhakaiya Urdu Zaban" [Dhakaiya Urdu Language]; "Dhakaiya Urdu Learning Centre" and "History of Urdu in Dhaka" aiming to preserve it. (Note: Dhakaiya Sobbasi Jaban and Dhakaiya Movement, among others, consistently write this dialect of Urdu using the Bengali script.)

== History ==
The city of Jahangirnagar (now Dhaka) was Bengal Subah's capital in the mid-eighteenth century, and Urdu-speaking Muslim merchants from North India started pouring in. Eventually residing in Dhaka, interactions and relationships with their Bengali counterparts led to the birth of a new Bengali-influenced dialect of Urdu. The descendants of these North Indian settlers came to be known as Khusbas (other names included Sukhbas and Subbas), meaning "the happily settled". The Bais and Bara panchayets used to converse in this dialect. Their Urdu language also influenced the dialect of the Bengali Muslims in Old Dhaka city which came to be known as the Dhakaiya Kutti and vice versa. However, Abdul Momin Chowdhury denied the contribution of Urdu as the source of this language. Because the dialect was not born yet. Sobbasi/Khosbasi is not the name of any language but the adjective and identifies some communities, as referred to by Hakim Habibur Rahman in Dhaka Pachas Baras Pahle.

The late 18th-century in Dhaka hosted the migration of Mirza Jan Tapish and other Urdu poets from Delhi, migrating to the urban hub after an invitation from Shams ad-Daulah, the Naib Nazim of Dhaka. Poetry and literature in Standard Urdu grew in popularity in Dhaka with the presence of organisations such as the Anjuman-i Taraqqi-i Urdu and the patronage of it by Dhaka's Nawabs, Sardars and Zamindars such as Khwaja Abdul Ghani and Mir Ashraf Ali. The 19th-century poet Mirza Ghalib of Agra was a close friend of Dhaka's poet Khwaja Haider Jan Shayek. The collaboration between Ghalib and Shayek was collected and compiled by Hakim Habibur Rahman, a later Urdu poet of Dhaka, in his book Inshaye Shayek. Habibur Rahman was a prominent Dhakaiya physician and litterateur whose most famous books include Asudegan-e-Dhaka and Dhaka Panchas Baras Pahle. He was the editor of Bengal's first Urdu magazine, Al-Mashriq in 1906. He later collaborated with Khwaja Adil in 1924 to found another monthly journal called Jadu. His works are celebrated for preserving Urdu, Persian and Arabic literature, compiling them into his Thulatha Ghusala.

Shortly after the Bengali language movement of 1952, Urdu culture decreased significantly, with many Urdu-speaking families switching to speaking Bengali to avoid controversy. During the Bangladesh Liberation War of 1971, several Urdu-speaking families subsequently migrated to Pakistan. As a result, the use of Urdu has become very limited to a few families and a community south of the Dhaka railway line. Furthermore, the new nation of Bangladesh deemed their newly founded nation on Bengali culture, which would later alienate the other ethnolinguistic communities of the country.

Often described as a wealthy and closed-off community, speakers of the dialect honour the Dhakaiya Urdu poets of the past in privacy within their mushairas. Other modern examples of usage include the University of Dhaka's dwindling Urdu department as well as the Urdu sermons and Islamic lectures given in Dhaka.

Due to globalization in the culture and entertainment sector, many Hindi words have entered the language today.

Nazir Uddin and Muhammad Shahabuddin Sabu, an associate professor of zoology at Savar Government College, released a Bengali-Dhakaiya Sobbasi bilingual dictionary published by Taqiya Muhammad Publications in 2021. Further, the Dhakaiya Urdu Jaban editorial board published another Bangla to Dhakaiya Urdu in February 2024.

=== Poets ===
These Dhakaiya poets wrote in Standard Urdu:

- Mirza Jan Tapish (d. 1814)
- Mahmud Azad
- Ghaffar Akhtar
- Agha Ahmad Ali (1839–1883)
- Ubaidullah Al Ubaidi Suhrawardy (Note: Suhrawardy was from Midnapore but later moved to Dhaka and contributed to Urdu literature there) (1834–1885)
- Khwaja Ahsanullah (1846–1901)
- Munshi Rahman Ali Tayesh (1823–1908)
- Nawab Syed Muhammad Azad (1850–1916)
- Khwaja Muhammad Afzal (1875–1940)
- Hakim Habibur Rahman (1881–1947)
- Reza Ali Wahshat (1881–1953)
- Syed Sharfuddin Sharf Al Hussaini (1876–1960)

== Media ==
The language flourished in the media during the 20th-century cinema. Khurshid Alam and Sabina Yasmin sang a song, Matiya Hamar Naam, in this dialect for the Bangladeshi film Jibon Niye Jua which released in 1975 after the Independence of Bangladesh.

== See also ==
- Kalkatiya Urdu
- Dhakaiya Kutti
- Bengali language movement
- Languages of Bangladesh
