= Mahifarash =

মাহিফরাস
- The chiefs of Dhaka's Muslim fish-businessmen Mahifarash community

Regions with significant populations
- Bangladesh (Old Dhaka)

Languages
- Bengali (Dhakaiya Kutti dialect, Standard Bengali)

Religion
- Sunni Islam

Related ethnic groups
- Dhakaiyas

The Mahifarash (Bengali: মাহিফরাস, romanized: mahifôrash, Dhakaiya: মাইফরাস maifôrash) are a Bengali Muslim community of fishmongers primarily from Old Dhaka. They are distinct from the Mahifarash of Tangail, who are descendants of Mappila Muslims, and the Mahifarash fishermen of Mymensingh.

== Etymology ==
The word Mahifarash comes from the Persian words māhi (ماهی) meaning fish and furosh (فروش) meaning sale. They are known as মাইফরাস maifôrash among Dhakaiyas.

== History and customs ==
Since the start of Mughal rule in Jahangir Nagar (Dhaka), the Mahifarash community of Dalti Bazar have exclusively monopolised the fish industry, and they continue to have authority in this sector in present times. Their customs were traditionally headed by a sardar who would also settle disputes. During the Mughal period, the Mahifarash were known to organise feasts and banquets in their Azimpur grounds at the start of cultivation harvest season. They cooked 20 to 25 mounds of rice and entertained thousands of people in addition to people from their own community. This feast would continue throughout the day, and was the precursor to what would later become known as Pohela Boishakh celebration.

== See also ==
- Sardari system
