= Shakrain =

Kite festival

Shakrain Festival
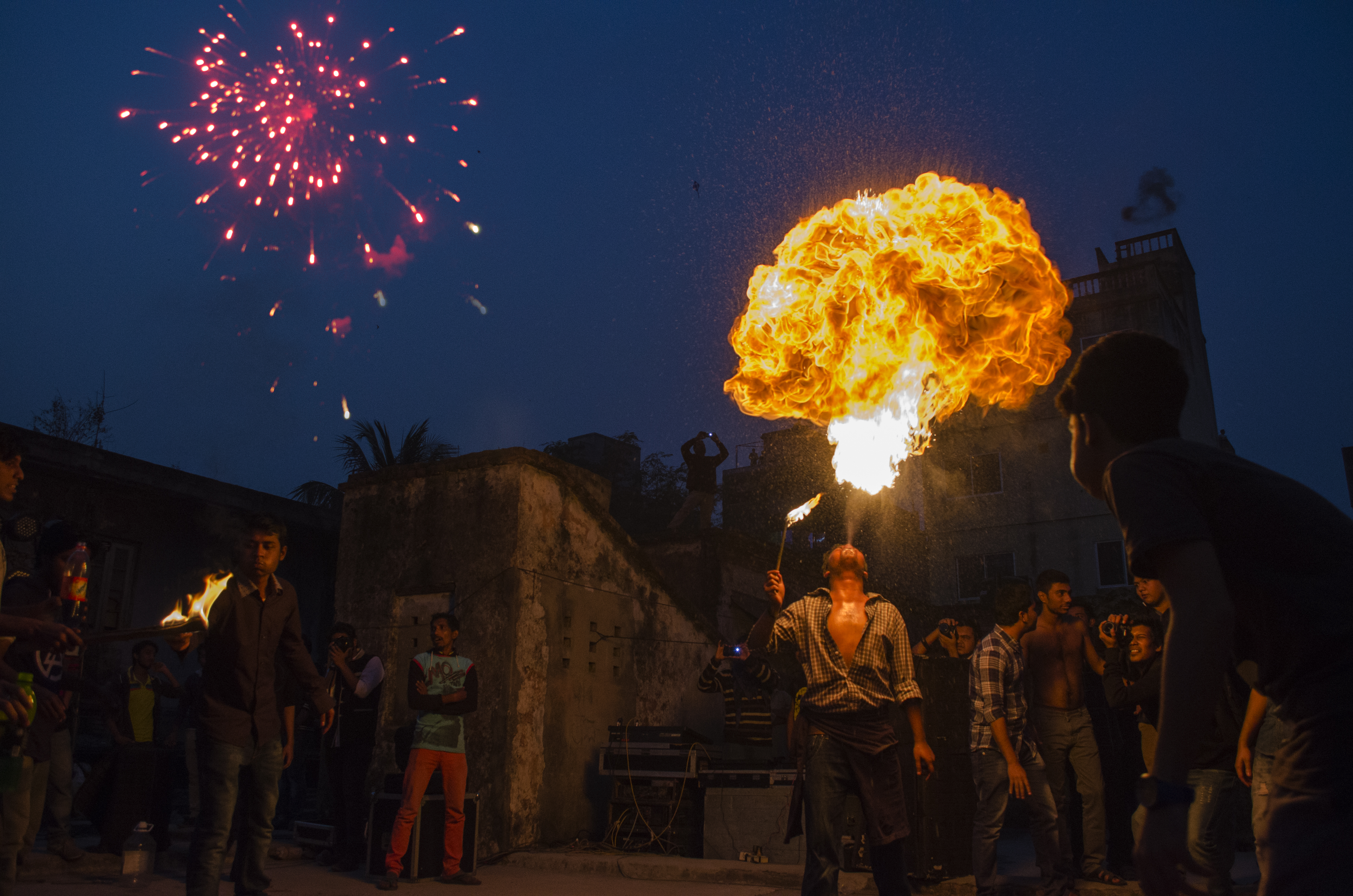
- Fire work during the festival
- Also called: Poush Sankranti
- Type: Traditional
- Date: January 14 or 15

Shakrain Festival (Bengali: সাকরাইন; also known as Kite Festival and Ghuri Utsob) is an annual Bengali celebration in Dhaka, Bangladesh, observed with the flying of kites. The celebration is uniquely celebrated by the Bengali Dhakaiya community based on Old Dhaka. It occurs at the end of Poush, the ninth month of the Bengali calendar (January 14 or 15 on a leap year, according to the Gregorian calendar). The festival coincides with the holiday of Poush Sankranti. This day is known as Poush Sankranti (Bengali: পৌষ সংক্রান্তি; End of Poush).

Shakrain Festival is one of the oldest annual festivals of Bangladesh. It is a famous and a significant event in Bangladeshi culture. It is the symbol of unity and friendship in Bangladesh.

== Etymology ==
Shakrain is derived from Bengali Shonkranti (সংক্রান্তি) which itself is derived from Sanskrit Saṅkrānti (संक्रान्ति), meaning "to move", "movement", "the passing of", or "astrological passage". The term refers to the movement of the sun from one position to another in the zodiac. However, Poush Sankranti or Makar Sankranti marks the transition of the sun from the zodiac of Sagittarius (dhanu) to Capricorn (makara). This transition coincides with the sun's movement from south to north.

== Events ==
Shakrain is celebrated mostly around the southern part of Dhaka city. As part of the celebration, colourful kites are flown high from the rooftops around the area in the afternoon. It often takes the form of kite fighting, in which participants try to snag each other's kites or cut other kites down.

== Customs ==
When night falls, fireworks light up the sky of old Dhaka. Flame-eaters also gather on the roofs to entertain people with their skills of manipulating fire. Music awakens the whole town, while people keep dancing from their hearts. Every household competes to see who can cook the largest variety of pithas, and after midnight, there are games similar to dice games that are played, but with fruits. A variety of sweets and traditional foods, especially kacchi biryani, a signature dish of Old Dhaka, are also served on this festive day.

== Gallery ==
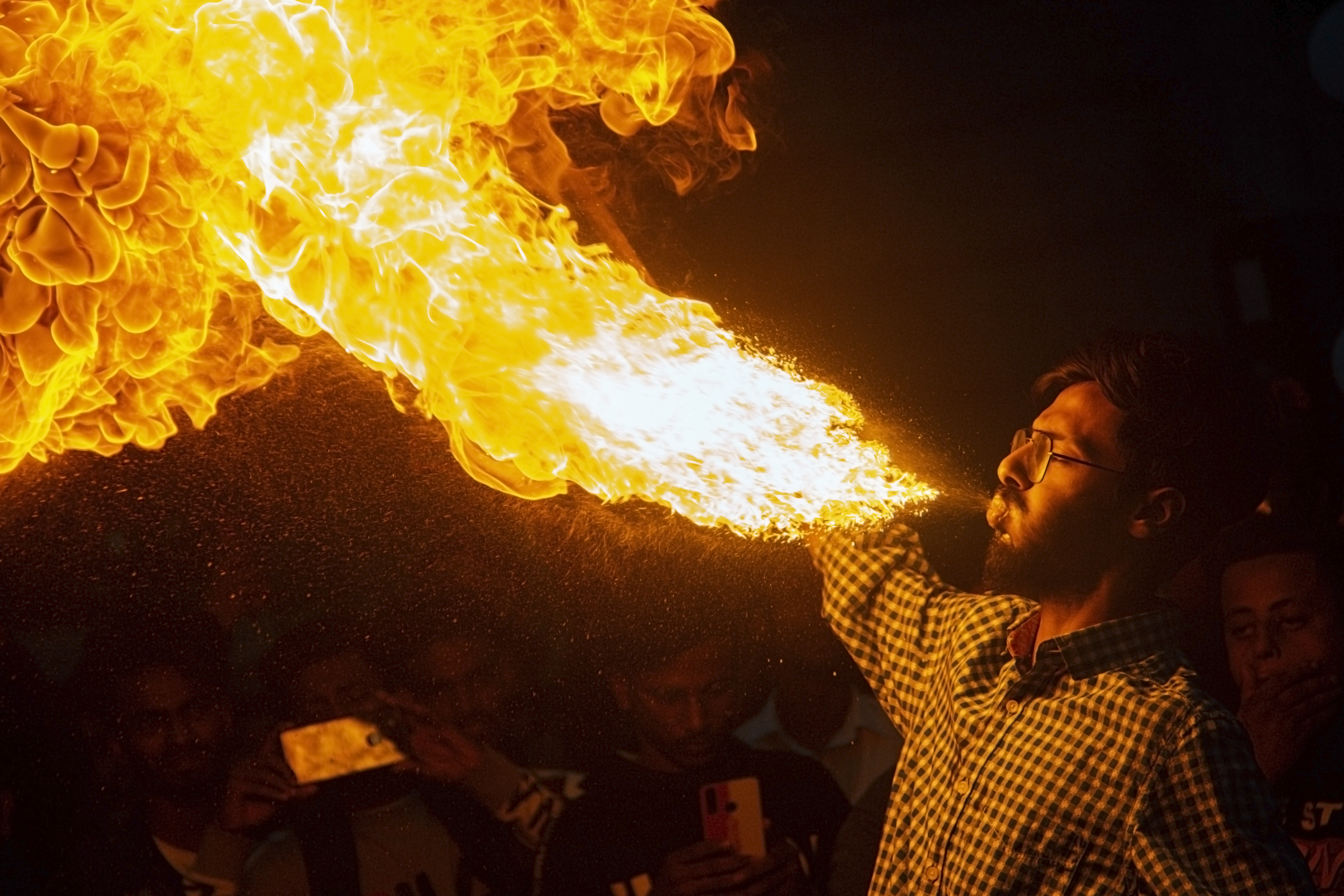
Firework during the festival

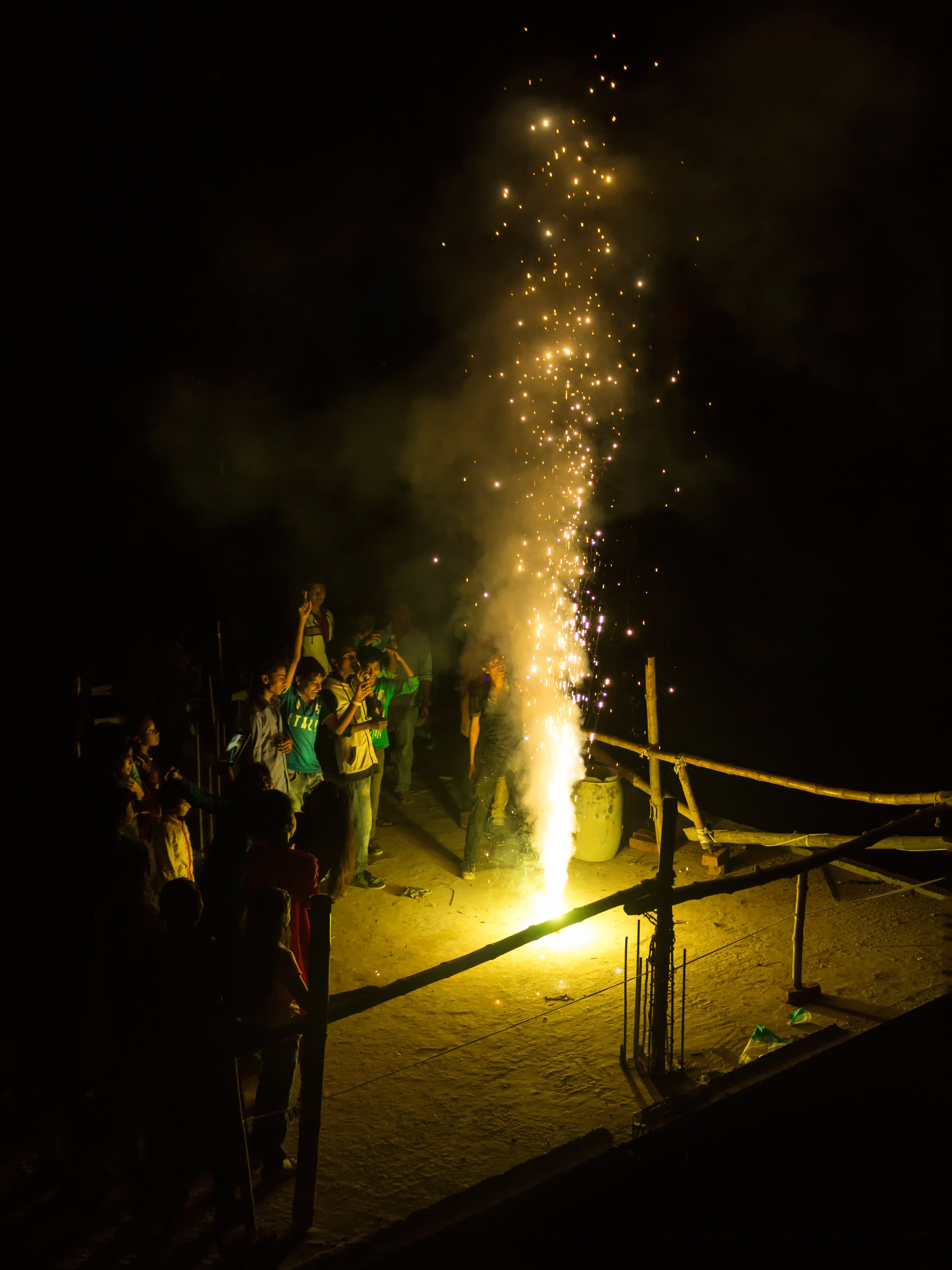
Firework during the festival

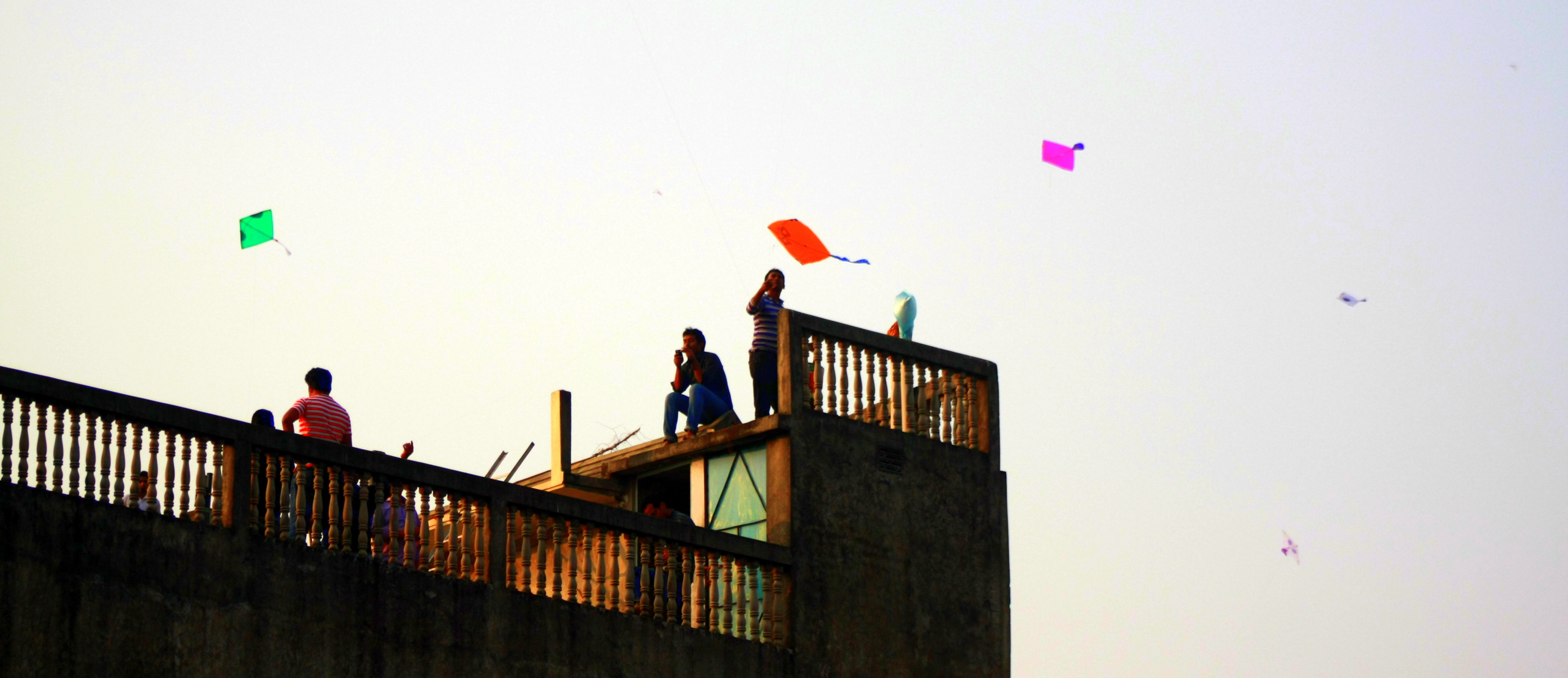

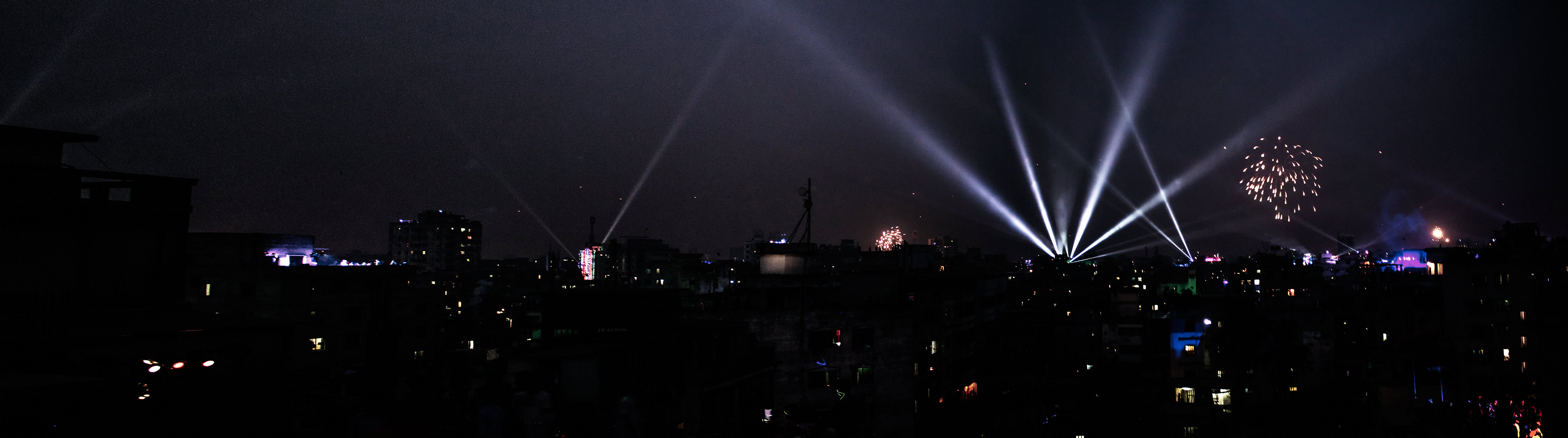

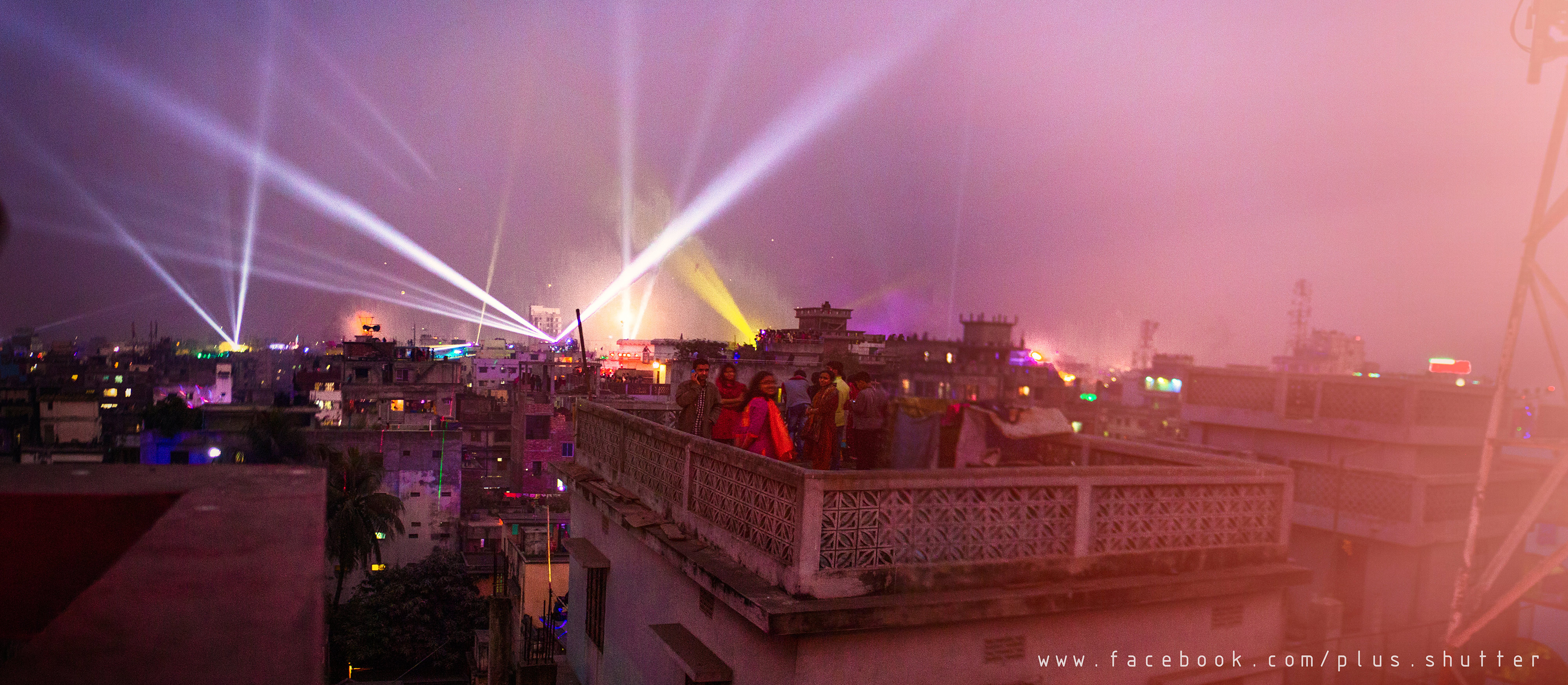

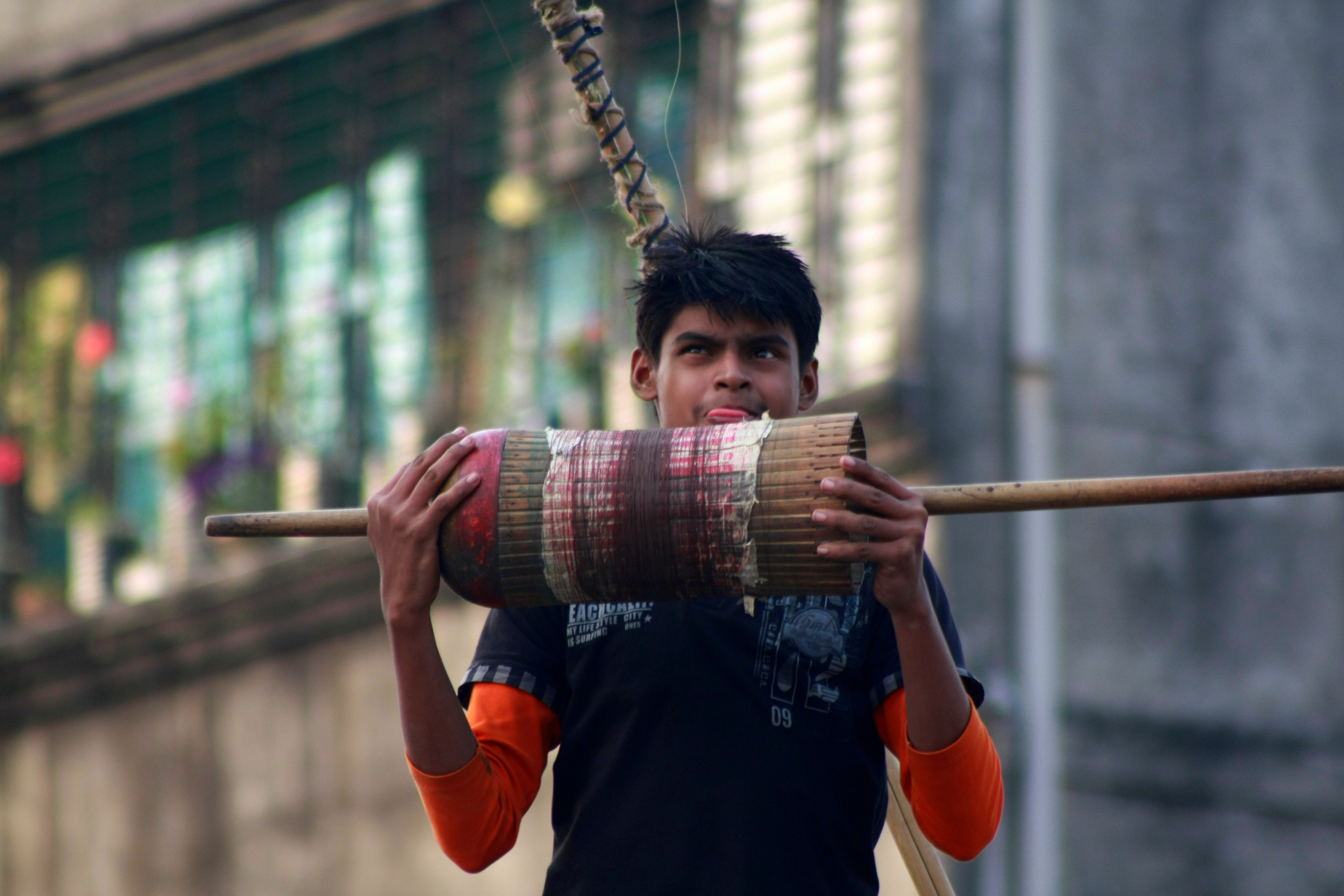

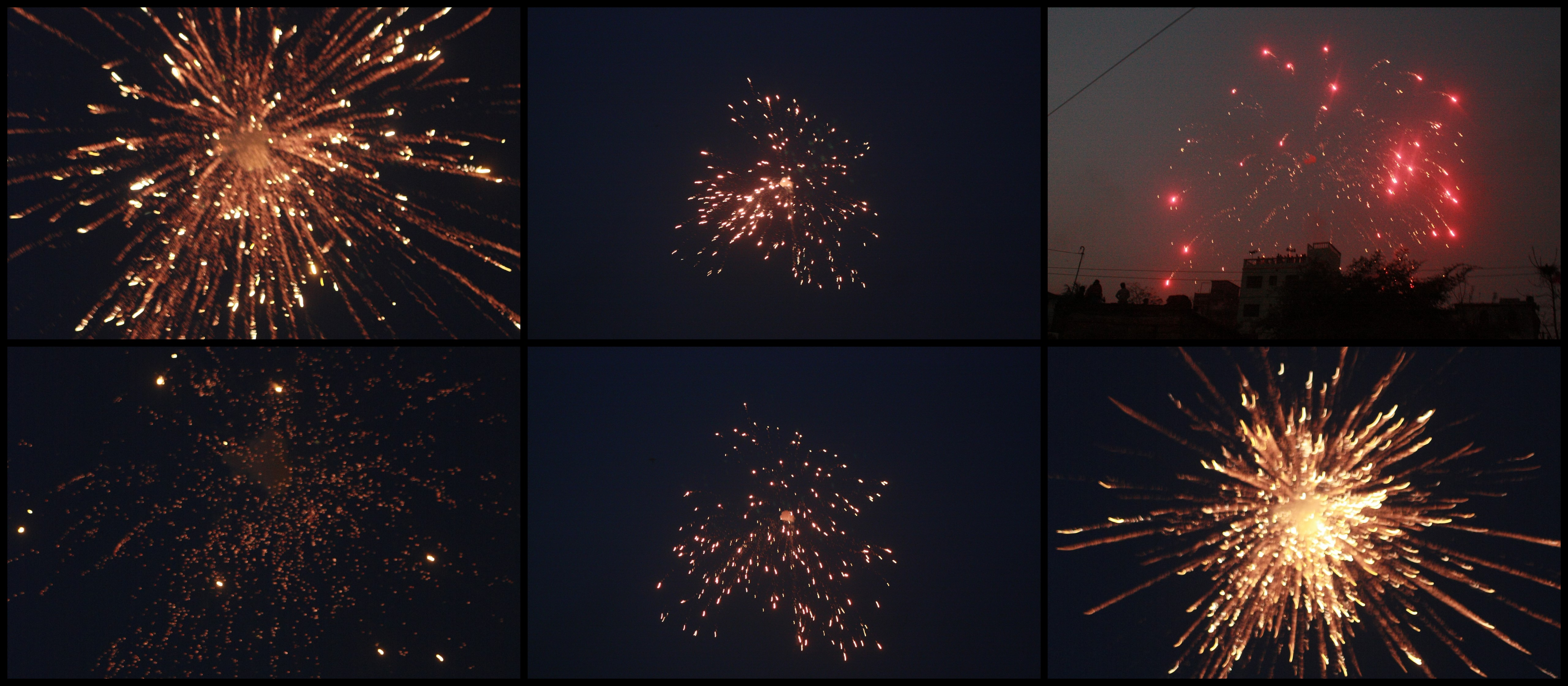

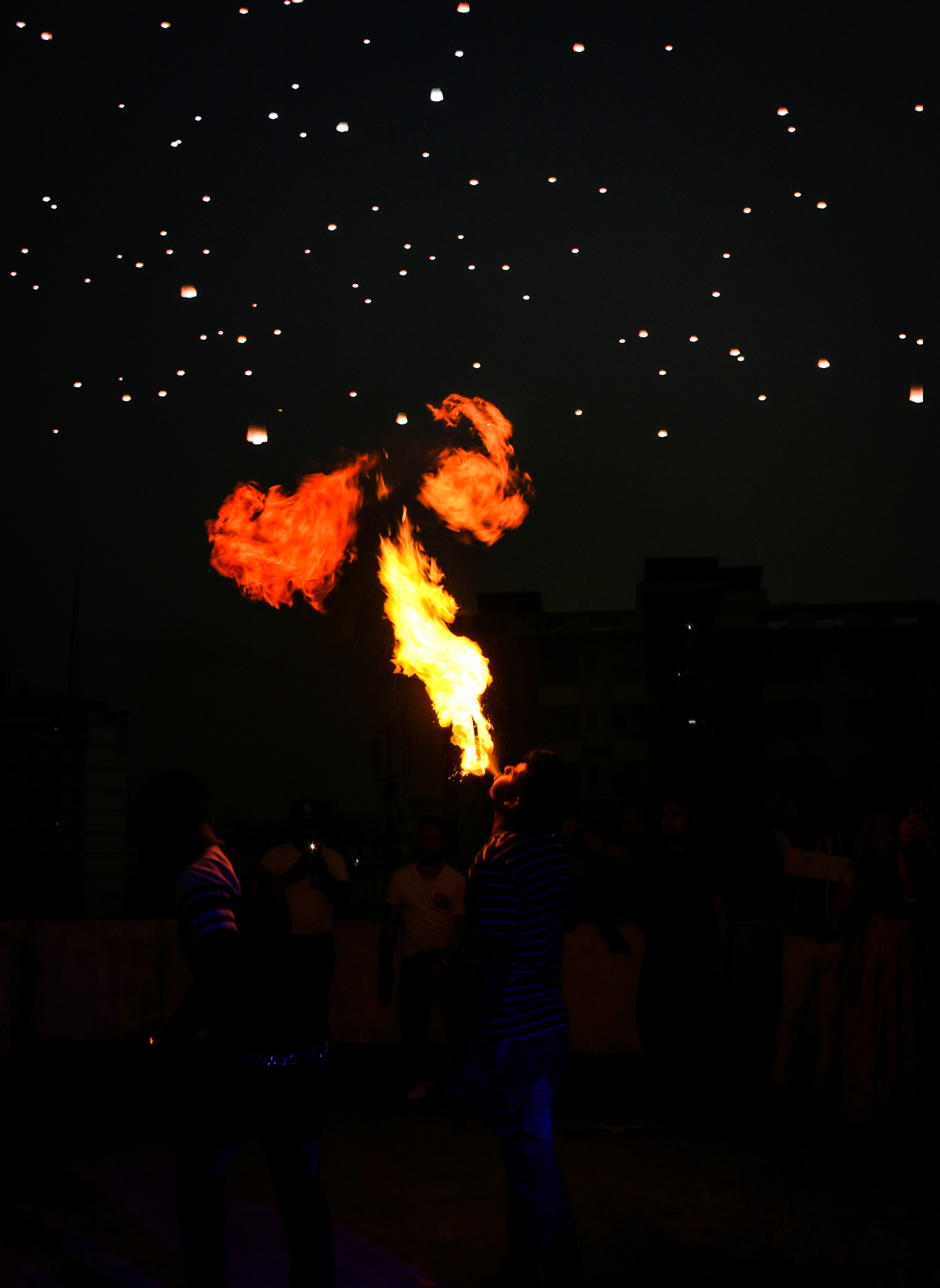

== See also ==
- Culture of Dhaka
- Dhakaiyas
- Magh Bihu, a festival in Assam which occurs around the same time
- Uttarayana
- Makar Sankranti
- International Kite Festival in Gujarat – Uttarayan
- Lohri
