= Shahi jilapi =

Bengali sweet

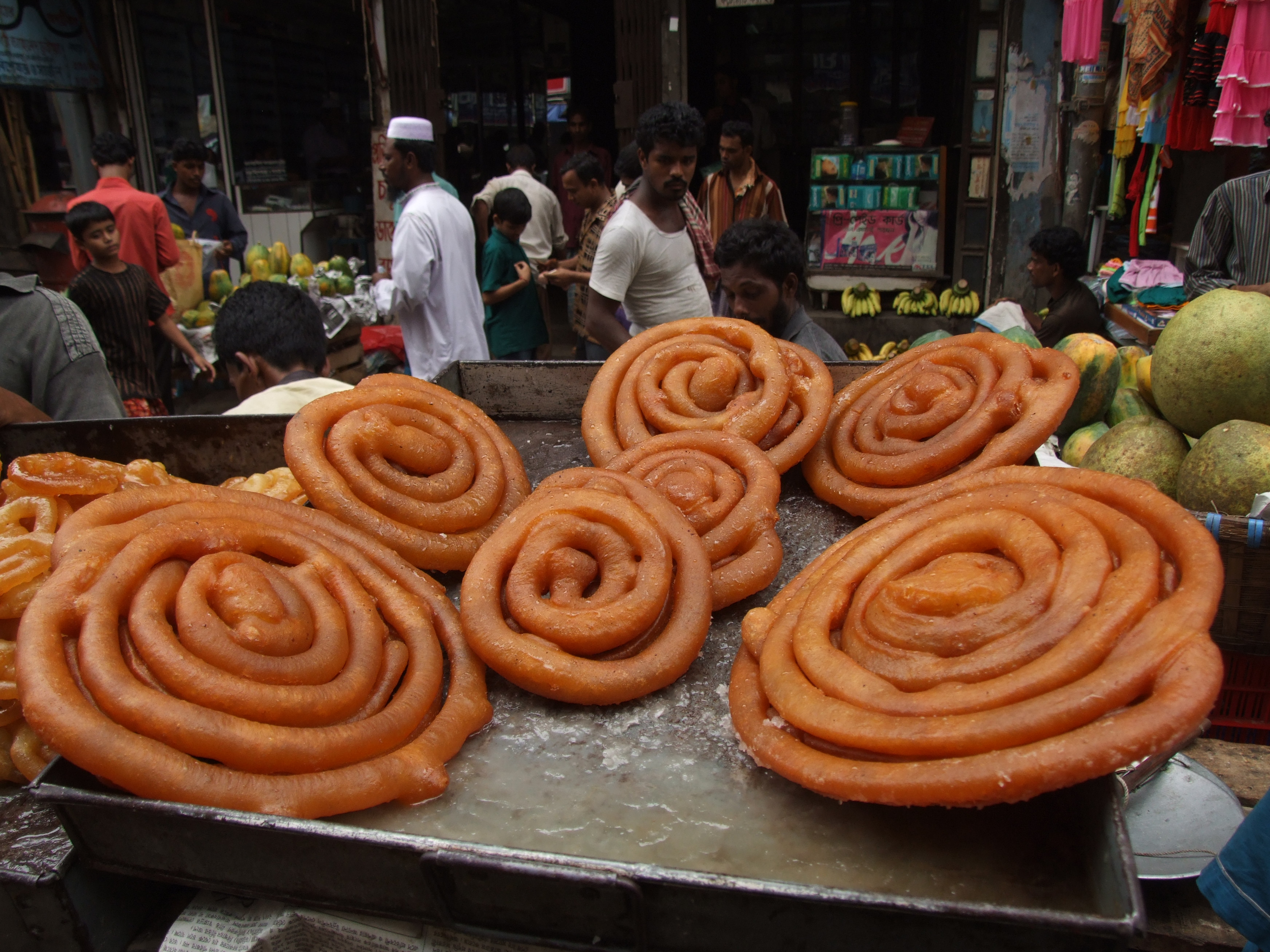
- Traditional shahi jilapi from Old Dhaka
- Type: Iftar, snacks
- Course: Dessert
- Place of origin: Chowk Bazaar, Old Dhaka, Bangladesh
- Region or state: Old Dhaka along with Bangladesh
- Associated cuisine: Bangladesh
- Created by: cook of the Dhaka Nawab's kitchen
- Serving temperature: Hot
- Main ingredients: Mashkolai dal, ghee, pea-flour, flour, dalda, sugar syrup
- Similar dishes: Jalebi, imarti, chhena jalebi, pench jilapi, chikon jilapi, reshmi jilapi

Shahi jilapi (Bengali: শাহী জিলাপি, romanized: shahī jilapi, lit. 'royal jalebi') is a famous traditional sweet originating from Chowk Bazaar in Old Dhaka of Bangladesh, which is well-known throughout the country. For Ramadan it is most commonly prepared and sold in Chowk Bazaar of Old Dhaka, a longtime iftar hub to the natives of Dhaka.

This traditional jilapi is made by twisting the dough like a coil. The radius of each jilapi can be a few inches and the weight varies from 1 to 2.5 kilograms. It is so large that it is eaten in iftar or as a snack by a group of three or four people.

== History ==
Although jilapi was created in the early fifteenth century, Shahi jilapi is a bit more modern addition. It was introduced to the Dhakaiya people a few decades ago. Families living in Old Dhaka, used to buy it and ate it together. Gradually, it also became popular at iftar and wedding or occasional banquets, and many others started to make it. The word Shahi, means something which is royal. Shahi jilapi came from the shahi kitchen(literally royal kitchen) of the Nawabs of Dhaka. They would eat it during family occasions and that's where the idea came from. Thus, therefore, the name of this large, delicious and famous sweetmeat is Shahi Jilapi.

== Ingredients ==
- Mashkolai dal
- Baking powder
- Sugar syrup
- Pea-flour
- Ghee
- Dalda
- Flour
- Oil
- Rose water
- Cinnamon
- Cardamom

etc.

== Preparations ==
At first ingredients like flour, baking powder, powdered milk and salt are mixed together. A paste is made by mixing hot milk and flour together. After rubbing the paste by hands like the dough of a ruti, it is then divided into several pieces and each of the piece is given a long shape. Then the pieces are turned into coil shape by twisting and get deep fried into oil. Syrup is made from sugar, water, cinnamon and cardamom in another pot while making sure that the syrup is not too thick or heavy. After that, the fried jilapies are then poured into the syrup as early as possible and get heated again for 4–5 minutes. As a result, the jilapies swells a little bigger. Then, for a couple of hours, the jilapies are kept inside the syrup so that all of the juice enters into the jilapi which makes them almost two times bigger. The process then ends.
