= Dhakaiya Kutti dialect =

Dialect of Bengali language spoken in Bangladesh

Dhakaiya Kutti Bengali
- Old Dhakaiya Bengali
- ঢাকাইয়া কুট্টি পুরাণ ঢাকাইয়া (Puran Dhakaiya)
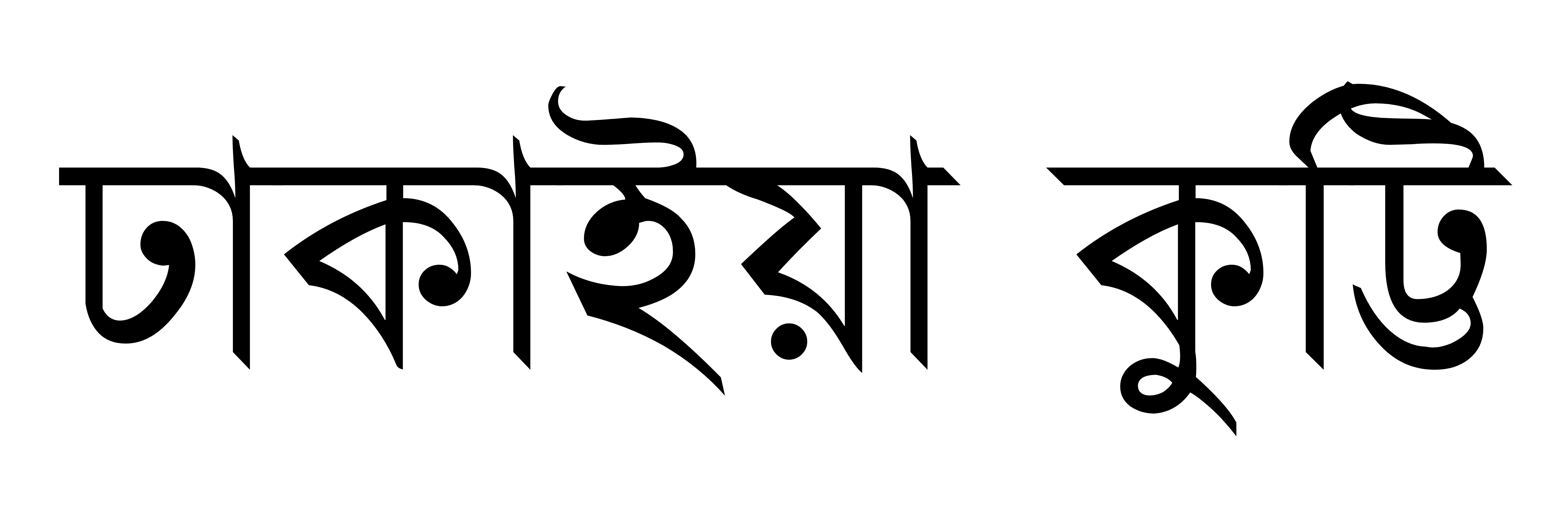
- Native to: Bangladesh
- Region: Old Dhaka
- Language family: Indo-European: Indo Iranian; Indo Aryan; Eastern Zone; Bengali-Assamese; Bengali; Eastern Bengali; Dhakaiya Kutti Bengali
- Writing system: Bengali alphabet

Language codes
- ISO 639-3: –
- Glottolog: vang1242 Vanga
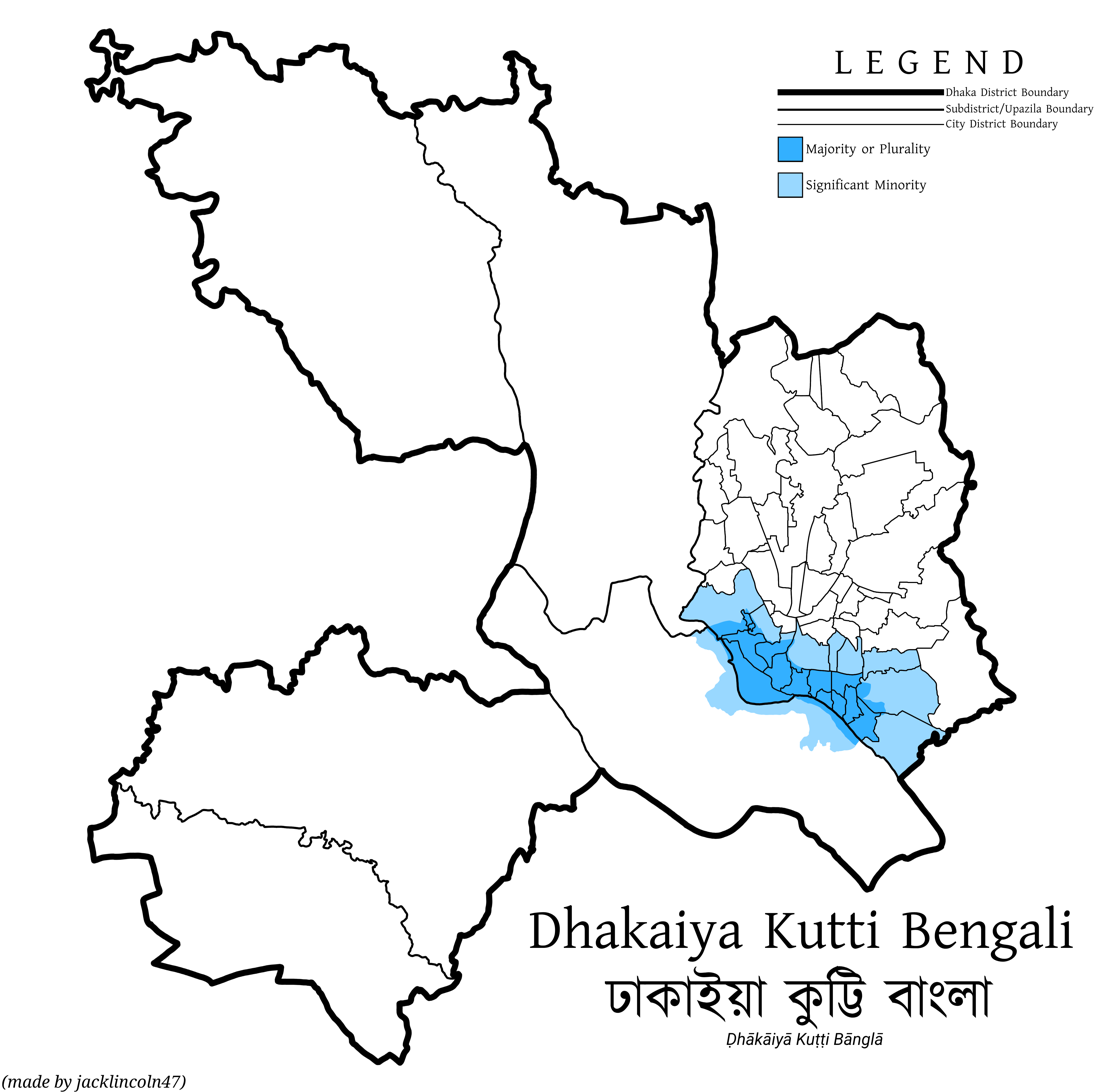
- Map of the Dhaka District and the areas where the Dhakaiya Kutti dialect is spoken.

Dhakaiya Kutti Bengali (Bengali: ঢাকাইয়া কুট্টি বাংলা, romanized: Dhakaiya Kutti Bengali, lit. 'Dhakaite dialect of the rice-huskers'), also known as Old Dhakaiya Bengali (Bengali: পুরান ঢাকাইয়া বাংলা, romanized: Purān Dhākāiyā Bānglā) or simply Dhakaiya, is a Bengali dialect, spoken by the Kutti-Bengalis of Old Dhaka in Bangladesh. This dialect is highly mutually intelligible with Standard Bengali and other varieties of Bengali. It is not used in formal settings anymore although historically the local Bais and Bara panchayets are said to have used it sometimes.

== Features ==
Dhakaiya Kutti Bengali is a typical eastern dialect of Bengali. As a result of interaction with the Urdu-speaking people in Old Dhaka, many Urdu loanwords entered in the dialect. It has only a few voiced aspirated sounds in comparison to Standard Bengali. Some voiced aspirated sounds such as [gʱ], [d̪ʱ], [bʱ] are pronounced like deaspirated and implosivised sounds [ɠ], [d̪] and [ɓ] respectively. The uses of epenthesis are extensively seen in the dialect like other typical eastern Bengali dialects whereas the standard dialect shows features like syncope and umlaut. The use of double sounds in certain words are also quite common. The word for younger brother-in-law, shala (শালা) in Standard Bengali and hala (হালা) in Dhakaiya Kutti Bengali and other eastern dialects, is seen as offensive in almost all Bengali dialects; in the Dhakaiya Kutti dialect, however, this is a common and inoffensive word which can be applied to teachers, parents and animals.

English	Standard Bengali	Dhakaiya Kutti Bengali
Boy	Chhele (ছেলে)	Pola (পোলা)
Girl	Meye (মেয়ে)	Maiya (মাইয়া)
Youngsters	Chhelemeye (ছেলেমেয়ে)	Polapan (পোলাপান)
True	Shotti (সত্যি)	Sotti (সত্যি)/Hacha (হাছা)
Why	Keno (কেন)	Kela (ক্যালা)
How	Kemon (কেমন)	Kemte (কেমতে)
Listen	Shon (শোন)	Son (সোন)/Hon (হোন)
After drinking tea	Cha kheye (চা খেয়ে)	Cha khaya (চা খায়া)
You'll go with me?	amar shonge jaben naki? (আমার সঙ্গে যাবেন নাকি?)	amar loge jaiben niki?(আমার লগে যাইবেন নিকি?)
What did you buy from market?	Bazar theke ki kinechhen? (বাজার থেকে কি কিনেছেন?)	Bazar theika/thon ki kinchhen? (বাজার থেইকা/থন কি কিনছেন?)
From	theke (থেকে)	theika (থেইকা)/thon (থন)
Banana	kola (কলা)	kolla (কল্লা)
Gourd/pumpkin	lau/kodu (লাউ/কদু)	koddu (কদ্দু)
But	kintu (কিন্তু)	mogor (মগর), magar - from Persian
Me too	amio (আমিও)	ami bi (আমি বি) bhi - from Hindustani
All	shob (সব)	sob (সব/ছব)
I see	dekhi (দেখি)	dehi (দেহি)
Going (present participle)	giye (গিয়ে)	giya (গিয়া)/jaiya (যাইয়া)
I'm doing (present continuous)	ami korchhi (আমি করছি)	ami kortachhi (আমি করতাছি)
Will do	korbo (করবো)	kormu/korum (করমু/করুম)

== History ==
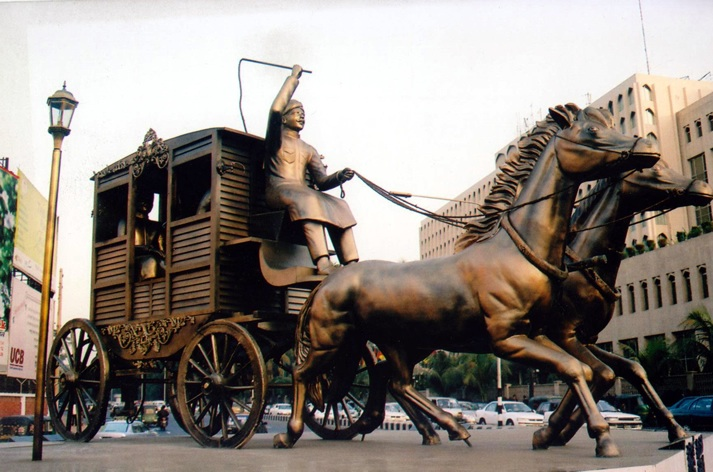
The Rajoshik sculpture, in front of the InterContinental Dhaka, displays a horse carriage that was once common in the city.

During the Mughal era, the Bengal Subah was famous for rice cultivation and the city of Jahangirnagar (now Dhaka) was the province's capital. Rice was a very important export product in the mid-eighteenth century, centred in Dhaka. The merchants who exported the rice were predominantly foreign Muslim merchants of noble descent with Mughal, Turkic, Persian, Afghan and Central Asian ancestry. These merchants would go to different areas in Eastern Bengal and collect the rice. The rice was first needed to be cleaned up using dhekis before packaging, and this process is called kuta (কুটা) in Bengali. Many local Bengali rice cultivators were employed to do this. They would come from various parts of Bengal to Dhaka to complete this job, and as it was long and tiring to get there and do the job, many of them started living in Dhaka. This migration took place circa 1760. However, not all were involved in the rice trade. The presence of the Mughals in Dhaka meant that there was generally a lot more employment opportunities there and so they took other occupations such as khansamahs, footsoldiers, guards, chefs and chauffeurs for the Dhakaiya Urdu-speaking Nawabs of Dhaka and other aristocratic families. These groups of people lived together and engaged in conversations and addas with their Hindustani counterparts and their main occupation led them to be known as kuttis. As a result of interaction of Bengalis with the merchant class in Old Dhaka led to influence the local eastern Bengali variety of Kutti community. The Bais panchayets of Old Dhaka in the twentieth-century used to converse in either Dhakaiya Urdu or Dhakaiya Kutti Bengali. Eventually, the common people living in the localities of Old Dhaka, Kutti or not, used to speak in this dialect.

Presently, the speakers of Kutti dialect are minority in Dhaka city following the mass migration of non-Dhakaite Bengalis from districts all over Bengal during the first and second partitions during the British colonial period. The new educated migrant community (now also commonly known as "Dhakaiyas" with the former now being referred to as "Old Dhakaiyas") spoke in Standard Bengali (Bengali: শুদ্ধ বাংলা, romanized: Shuddho Bangla), a standardised dialect of Bengali. The culture of Kuttis of Old Dhaka is in decline due to the influence of Dhaka city, as the capital, welcoming migrants from all over the country who are not familiar with their regional culture. Some of the Dhakaiya kutti-Bengali community began to see the new migrant community as their opponents due to these dialectal and regional cultural differences. This division was the source of modern troubles in the identities of the Old Dhakaiyas (who view themselves as original inhabitants in the city) and the post-partition migrant community (who currently form the majority in the city).

== Literature and media ==
There has been literature written in the Dhakaiya Kutti Bengali. One popular poem is "Channi-poshor Raiter Lour" (চান্নিপশর রাইতের লৌড়) by Jewel Mazhar. Dhakaiya Kutti natoks are popular throughout the country and even the Indian Bengali filmmaker, Satyajit Ray, has written dialogues in this dialect. The Kutti-Bengali folk of Dhaka are renowned for "Kutti Jokes" and the dialect's humorous aspect in general; generally consisting of short stories in which Dhakaiyas mess around with the Bhadralok gentry. It is considered to be one of the wittiest among Bengali dialects. Generally referred to as "Dhakaiya" folk, they call outsiders or non-Dhakaite Bengalis by the name "Gaiya" (গাঁইয়া), meaning from the village, and Kolkatans in particular as Demchi (ডেমচি).
