= Chowk Bazaar =

Wholesale market area in Dhaka, Bangladesh

Coordinates: 23.7170°N 90.3963°E

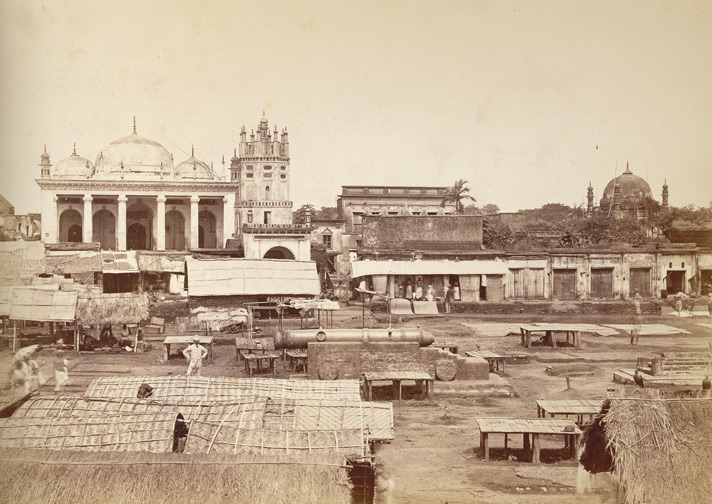
General view of the market place, 1885. Picture shows (in the center) the Bibi Mariam Cannon

Chowk Bazaar is a sprawling wholesale market area in Dhaka, Bangladesh, with hundreds of shops, market stalls and vendors. It dates to the 17th century CE when the area was under Mughal rule. The bazaar is located in the Chowkbazar Thana part of Old Dhaka.

Beside the market square is Chawk Mosque, built in 1676 by Shaista Khan, the Subahdar of Mughal Bengal. It is 94 feet long and 80 feet wide and has three domes.

== Chowk Bazaar iftar ==
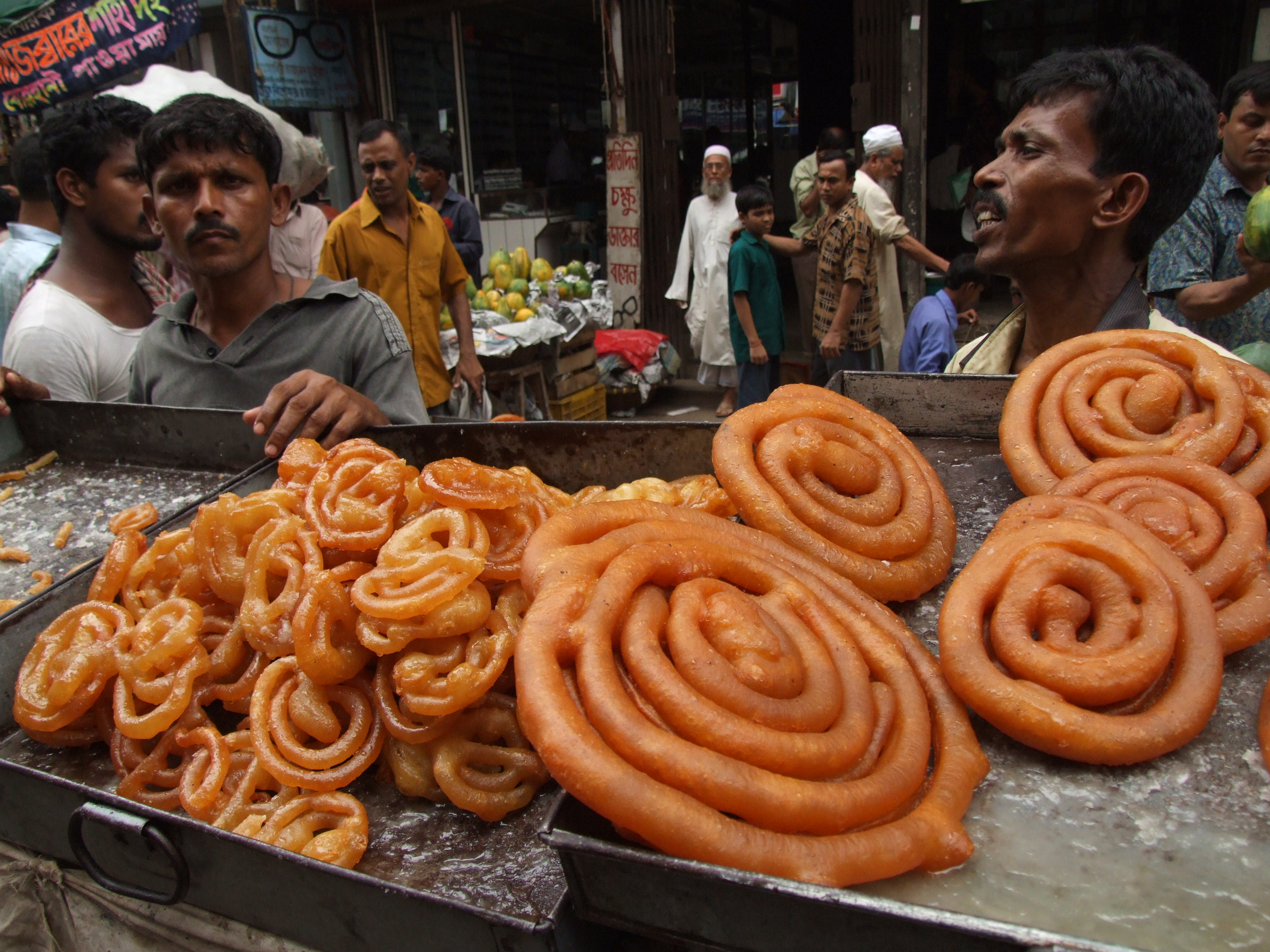
Shahi jilapi, popular for its large size

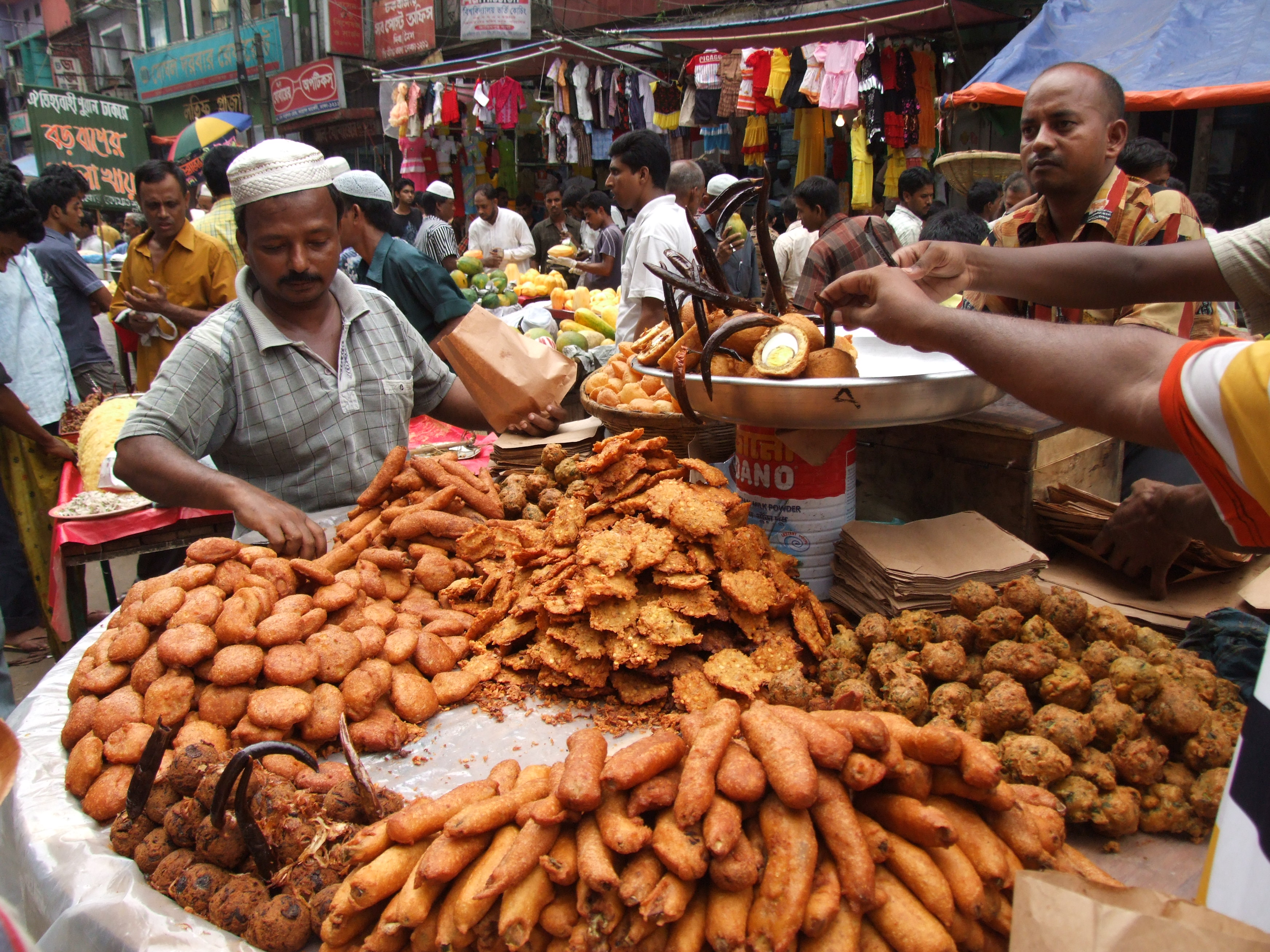
Traditional Bengali iftar items

Chowk Bazaar has a great significance in Bengali culture during Ramadan. While its popularity as a business hub has diminished over the years, Chowk Bazaar is the busiest iftar market. One of the most iconic, and often derided, items sold there is the boro baper polay khay. Other well-known dishes include shahi jilapi, commonly known as "sunflower jalebis", beguni, piyaju, keema paratha, beauty lassi, koel roast, dim chop, alur chop, puran Dhaka haleem, Hajir biryani, chickpeas, fruit, pithas and mishtis (Bengali sweets) like sandesh, roshogolla, chomchom, rasmalai, bakarkhani, pantua, chhena jalebi, and others. In 2023 UNESCO added iftar to its list of Intangible Cultural Heritage.
