= Bakarkhani =

Flatbread

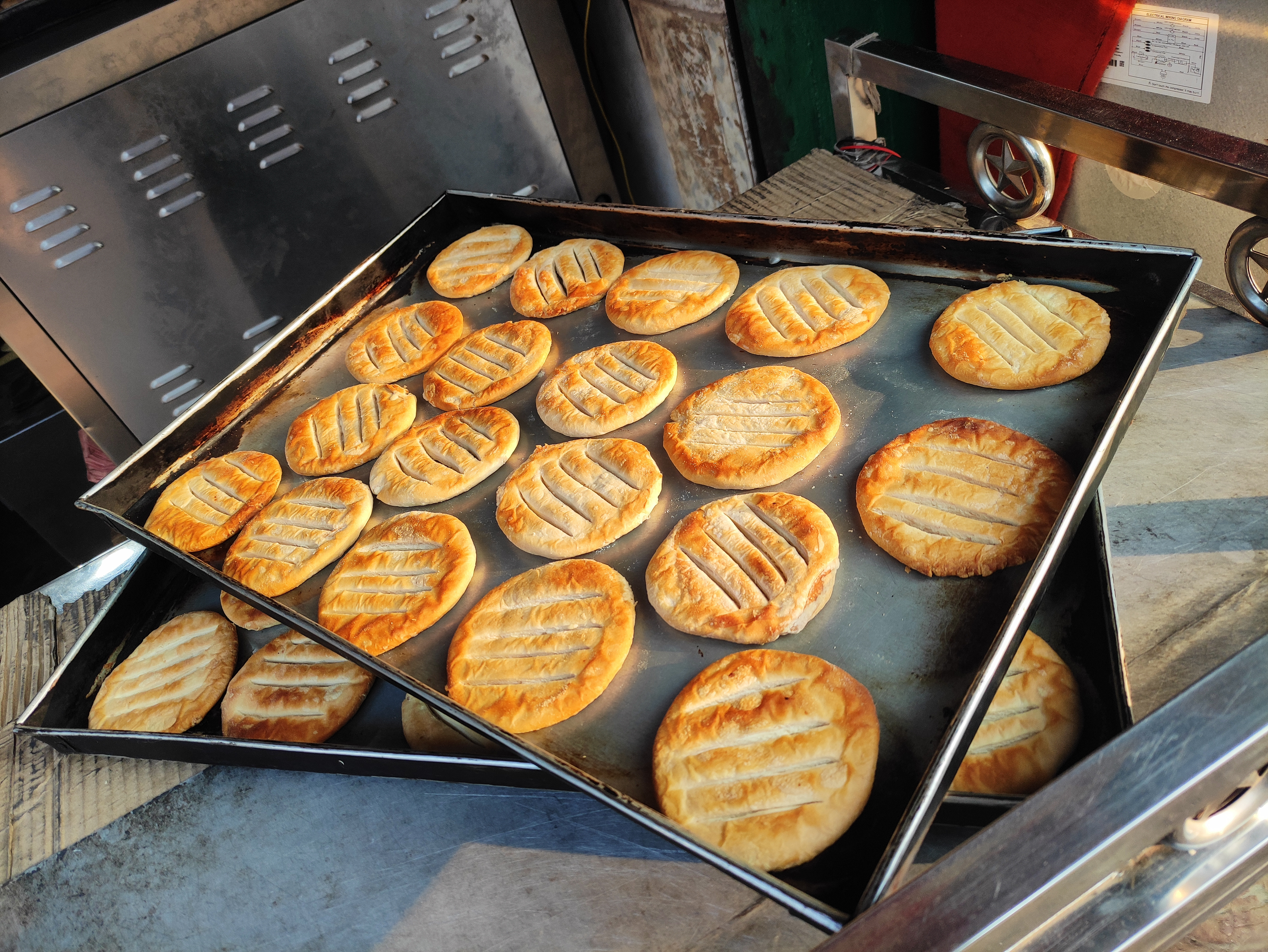
- Bakarkhani being made in Dhaka, Bangladesh. They can be seen lining the walls of the tandoor oven.
- Alternative names: Shukha
- Type: Bread
- Course: Appetizer or dessert
- Associated cuisine: Bangladesh, India and Pakistan
- Main ingredients: Dough, ghee, milk, sugar (optional)
- Variations: Gao-joban, shuki (shukha), nimshuki, kaicha-ruti, mulam, chinshuki, Kashmiri

Bakarkhani, baqarkhani or bakorkhoni, also known as bakarkhani roti, is a thick, spiced flatbread that is part of the Mughlai cuisine. Bakarkhani is prepared on certain Muslim religious festivals in South Asia and is now popular as a sweet bread.

Bakarkhani is almost biscuit-like in texture, with a hard crust. The chief ingredients are flour, semolina, sugar, molasses soaked in saffron, poppy or nigella seeds, salt, and ghee (clarified butter).

== Legend ==
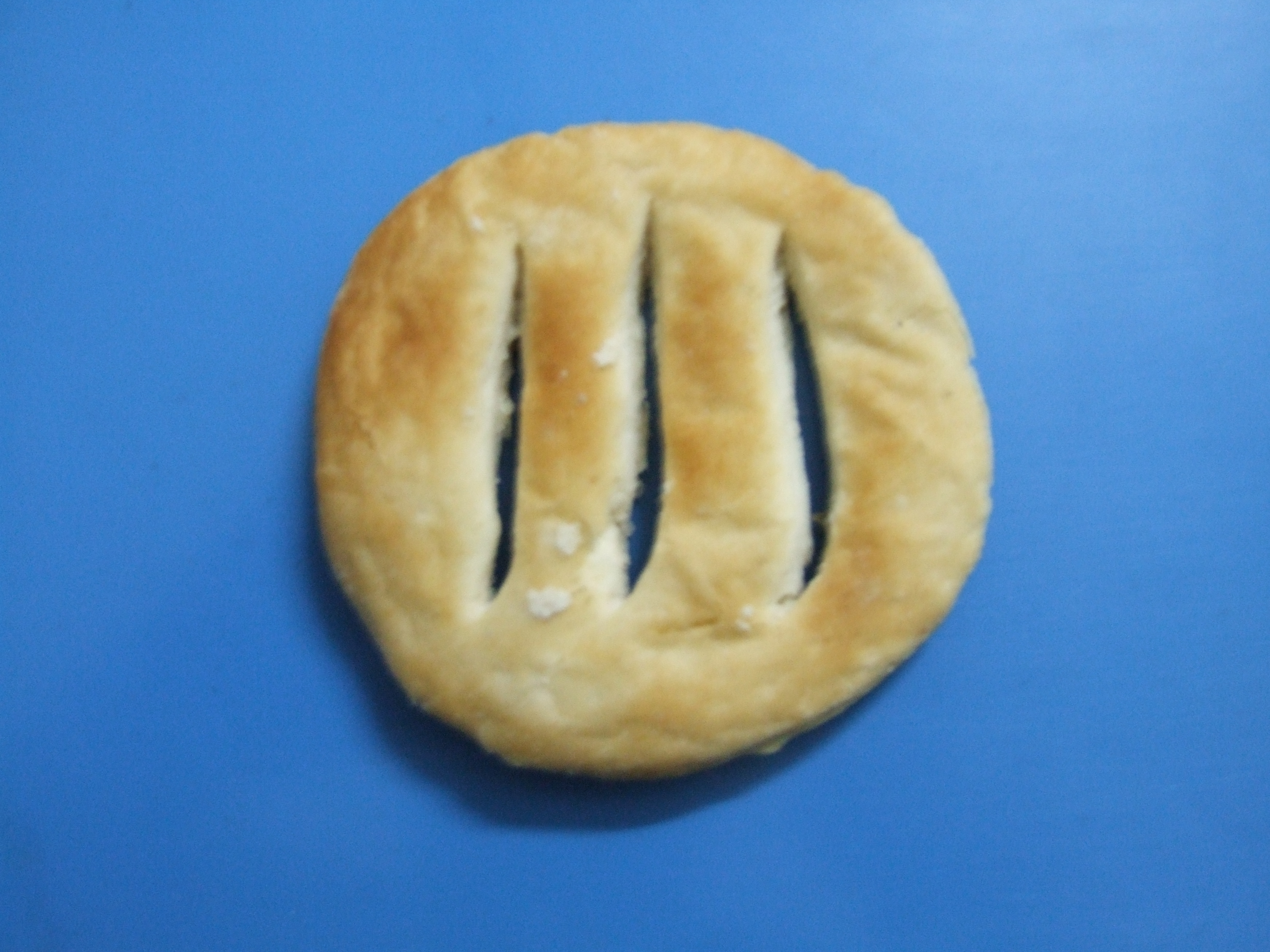
A single bakarkhani

A legend attributes the bread's name to Mirza Agha Baqer, a son-in-law of Murshid Quli Khan II. According to the legend, Baqer, a general based in Chittagong under Nawab Siraj ud-Daulah of Bengal, falls in love with a dancer called Khani Begum from Arambagh, who was also eyed by Zaynul Khan, the city's kotwal and the son of a wazir. Zaynul attempts to attack Khani for rejecting him, and Baker intervenes, defeating Zaynul in a swordfight. Zaynul 's two companions go and lie to his father, the wazir, telling him that Baker has killed Zaynul. Out of fury, the wazir orders them to put Baker inside a cage with a tiger. Baker kills the tiger and at the same time, the claim of Zaynul's death is found to be false. The wazir, Jahandar Khan, and his son Zaynul then kidnap Khani and set off for South Bengal. The battle continues there as Baker arrives to rescue Khani. In another brawl of talwars, Jahandar accidentally kills Zaynul, after Zaynul inadvertently murders Khani. Khani is later buried in Bakla-Chandradwip (Patuakhali-Barisal). Baker Khan builds a tomb over her grave and Bakla-Chandradwip would be renamed Bakerganj after him. Baker was already familiar with this area as he was a jagirdar in Barisal's Salimabad and Umedpur parganas. The tragic love story of Baker Khan and Khani Begum inspired the bakers to name his favourite bread Bakerkhani. Dhaka's first bakarkhani shop opened in close proximity to Lalbagh Fort and many of the city's bakarkhani sellers originate from the Sylhet Division.

The Bengal Subah, specifically Mughal Dhaka, was a hub for merchants from all parts of the subcontinent and even as far as the Middle East and Armenia. Through trade and travel, the bakarkhani became popular outside of Bengal in places such as Kashmir, Bihar, Lucknow and Hyderabad.

== Regions ==
Bakarkhani is popular in the regions of Pakistan, India, Bangladesh, Afghanistan and Russia.

Utsa Ray, a culinary historian, described bakarkhani as the "pride" of the "gastronomic culture of Dhaka" and according to other scholars, "Bakorkhoni gives Old Dhaka a unique and distinct culinary identity". According to Hakim Habibur Rahman, bakorkhoni could not be found anywhere else than Dhaka during the colonial period.

== Preparation ==
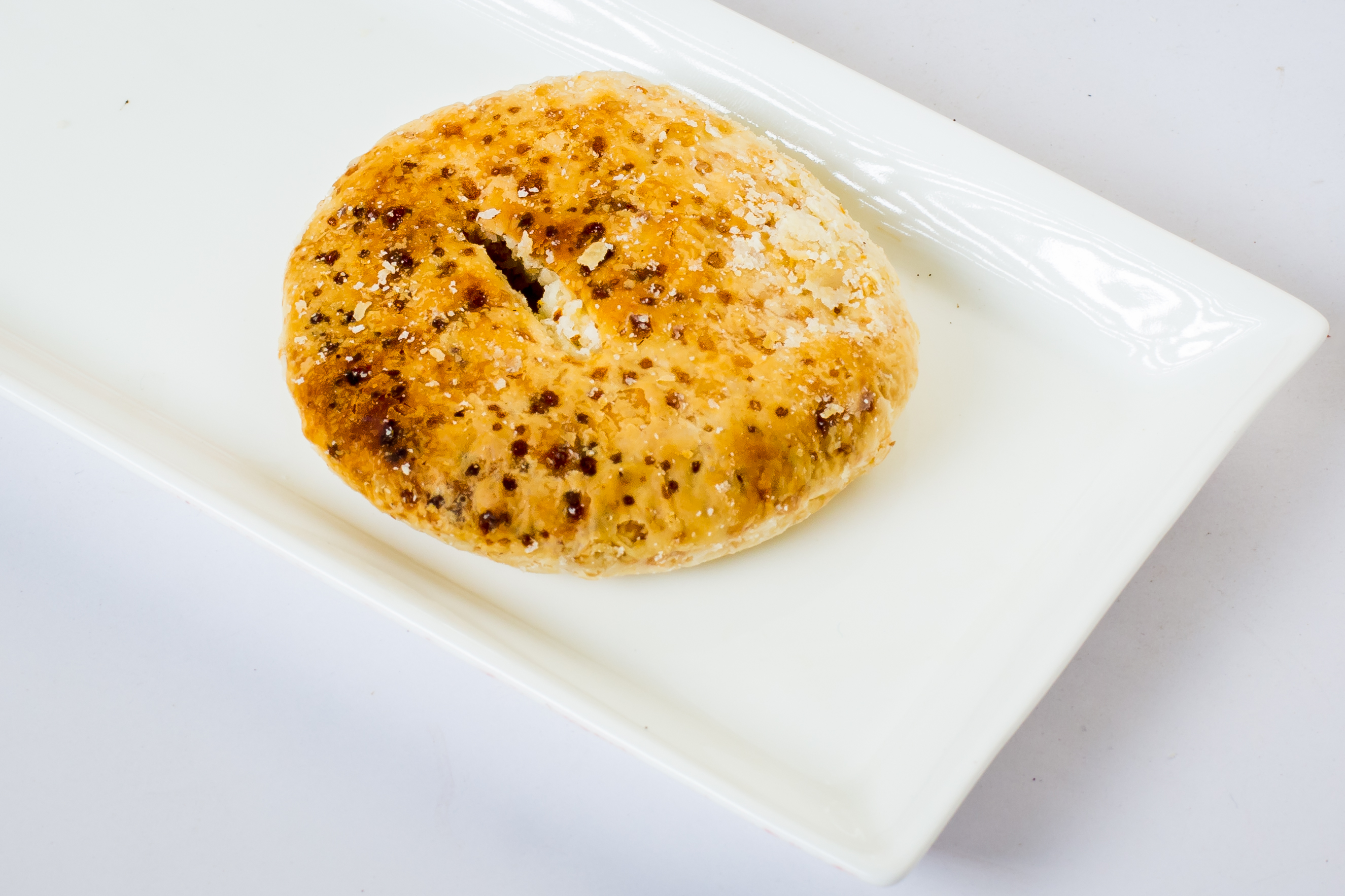
A plate of bakarkhani

Bakarkhani is made by kneading together flour, ghee, in some cases cardamom, sugar and salt with water. The dough is then flattened. The bread is made by stretching a sheet of dough repeatedly and interleaving with ghee, molasses, saffron water, poppy or nigella seeds before baking on a tandoor or tawa girdle.

== Variations ==
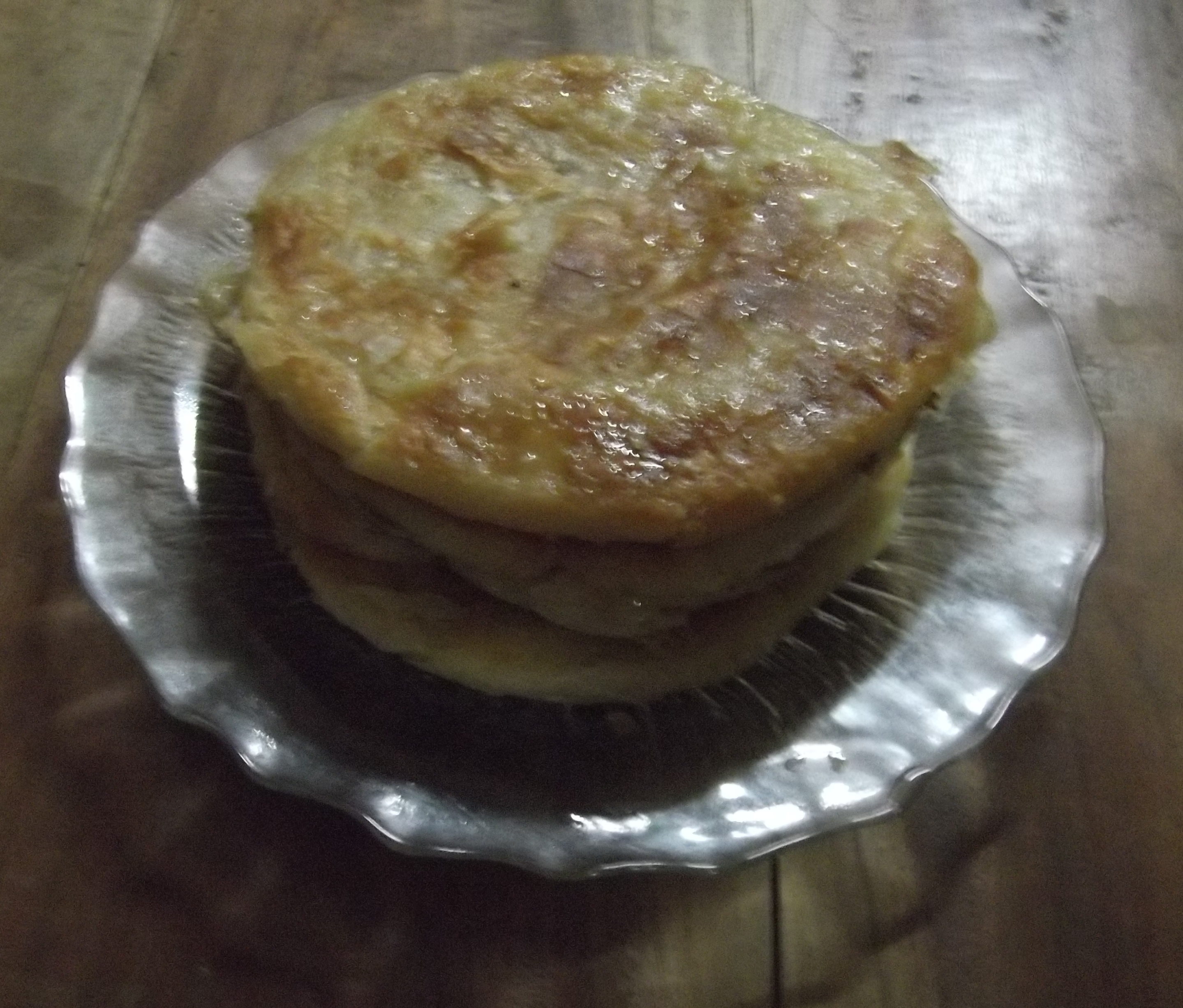
Chittagonian bakorkhoni

It is also known as shukha (meaning 'dry') naan or shukha roti due to its dry texture. Hakim Habibur Rahman, author of Dhaka Panchas Baras Pahle, lists three variations of bakarkhani: gao-joban, shuki (shukha) and nimshuki. There are also other variations such as kaicha-ruti, mulam and chinshuki.

Outside of Dhaka, different types of bakarkhani are eaten across the country. The bakarkhani of Sylhet and Chittagong resemble a sweet and syrupy porota, whilst the bakarkhani of Dinajpur is thick and doughy and often contains pieces of morobba.

There is also a Kashmiri variant of bakarkhani which is a thinner variety, similar to round naan in appearance, but crisp and layered, and sprinkled with sesame seeds. It is typically consumed hot, during breakfast, often with noon chai.

== In literature ==
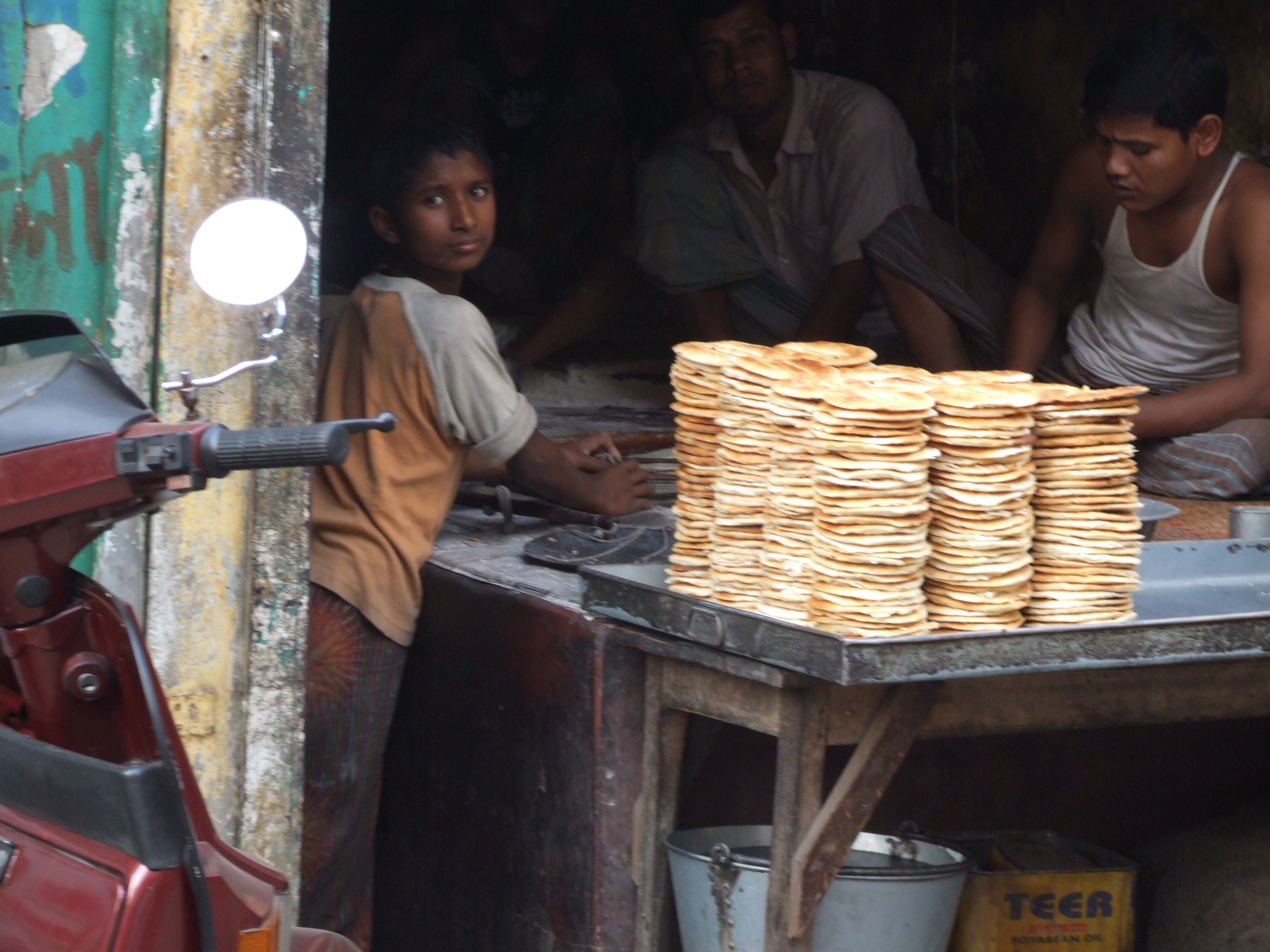
Bakorkhani shop in Old Dhaka

Bakarkhani is mentioned in lines of a Bengali poem by Pratul Mukhopadhyay:

‘আলু বেচো, ছোলা বেচো, বেচো বাকরখানি
বেচো না বেচো না বন্ধু তোমার চোখের মণি।

— Pratul Mukhopadhyay
Translation:

Sell potatoes, sell gram, sell Bakarkhani
Don't sell, don't sell, friend, the jewel in your eye.

== See also ==
- List of Indian breads
- List of Pakistani breads
