= Agha Ahmad Ali =

Indian Urdu poet

Maulawi Agha Ahmad Ali Isfahani
- آغا احمد علي
- Born: Aga Ahmed Mazhar Ali Ahmod; 17 December 1839; Dacca, Bengal Presidency
- Died: June 1873 (aged 33); Dacca, Bengal Presidency (modern-day Bangladesh)
- Occupation: Poet
- Predecessor: Munshi Mutasim Billah, Khwaja Asadullah Kawkab
- Successor: Muhammad Ashraf, Abdus Samad Fida

Maulawi Āghā Aḥmad ʿAlī (Persian: آغا احمد علي, Bengali: আগা আহমদ আলী) was a 19th-century Bengali academic, historian and scholar of the Persian language. In addition to Persian, he also composed poetry in Urdu. He is seen as one of the greatest Persian scholars of Dhaka, and even Bengal as a whole.

== Life ==
Agha Ahmad Ali's grandfather Agha Abdul Ali was a calligraphist who originated from Isfahan in Iran and settled in the city of Dhaka during Nader Shah's invasion of India. Ahmad's father was Agha Shajaat Ali, who had a hobby of collecting rare manuscripts. Ahmad studied Persian locally with Munshi Mutasim Billah as well as Khwaja Asadullah Kawkab, a noteworthy poet of the Dhaka Nawab family. He developed a personal library of over 2000 books. It is said that he completed all valuable books in the city of Dhaka some time between 1856 and 1860.

Ali involved himself in a literary competition with Mirza Ghalib, a prominent poet of the Indian subcontinent, after Ghalib criticised Mohammad Hossein ibn-khalaf Tabrizi's Persian dictionary Burhan-e-Qate. In response, Ali wrote the Muayyid-i-Burhan in 1865 in defence of Tabrizi. In 1867, Ghalib responded to Ali in Tegh-i-Tez (Urdu: تیغ تیز, Sharp Blade), a 32-page long Urdu pamphlet rebutting Ali's points and objecting more things from Tabrizi's book. It ended with a sixteen-question long questionnaire answered indirectly by Nawab Mustafa Khan Shefta through Shefta's three students Altaf Hussain Hali, Sadat Ali Khan and Nawab Ziauddin Ahmad Khan. Ali again replied in challenge to Ghalib, with a booklet called Shamsher-i-Teztar (Urdu: شمشیر تیزتر, Sharper Sword) but he had it published under the name of his student Maulvi Abdus Samad Fida Sylheti. Ghalib's two pupils Syed Mohammad Baqir Ali Baqir and Khwaja Syed Fakhruddin Husain Sukhan responded. The four qataa were compiled as the Dil Ashob Hangama (Heart ravaging fight) in April 1867. Ali then replied with another qataa, again under Fida's name, and compiled all 5 and published it as Tez-i-Teghtar.

In 1862, he established the Calcutta Madrasah-i-Ahmadiyah (named after himself and not related to the Ahmadiyyah movement). He started to teach Persian at the Calcutta Aliyah Madrasah in 1864 taking the advice of Edward Byles Cowell, the principal of the Sanskrit College. In addition to this, Ali also taught Persian to Cowell as well as Heinrich Blochmann, another leading European orientalist. With a number of students, Ali's most senior disciples were Muhammad Ashraf and Fida Sylheti. Agha Ahmad Ali died of tuberculosis in June 1873, in his early 30s. He was buried in the graveyard near the langar khana of Mirza Saheb.

== Works ==
Agha Ahmad Ali worked closely with The Asiatic Society and contributed heavily to the Bibliotheca Indica. He wrote a number of commentaries on historical works such as:

- Maasir-i-Alamgiri of Muhammad Saqi Mustaidd Khan
- Wis o Ramin
- Volumes 1 and 3 of Tarikh-i-Badayuni
- Iqbal nama-i Jahangiri
- Nizami Ganjavi's Sikandarnama
- Akbarnama of Abu'l-Fazl ibn Mubarak

Some of his other works included:

- Haft Asman (history of Persian masnavi, 1869)
- Muayyid-i-Burhan (1865) and Shamsher-i-Teztar (both on Persian lexology, 1868)
- Risalah-i-Taranah (on Persian rubaʿi, 1866)
- Risalah-i-Ishtiqaq (on Persian grammar, 1872)
- Risalah-e-Mukhtasar Al-Ishtiqaq (abridged version of the former)
- Tarikh-i-Dhaka (history of Dhaka, 1865)
