= Hakim Habibur Rahman =

Unani physician and politician (1881–1947)

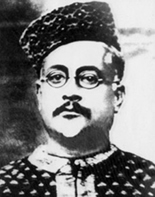
- Hakim Habibur Rahman
- Born: 23 March 1881; Choto Katra, Dacca, Bengal Presidency
- Died: 23 February 1947 (aged 66); Dacca, Bengal Presidency
- Citizenship: British India
- Education: Madrasah-e-Alia Dacca
- Occupations: Physician, writer, journalist, politician
- Years active: 1904–1947
- Organization: Anjuman-e-Urdu
- Notable work: Asudegan-e-Dhaka, Dhaka Panchas Baras Pahle, Al-Fariq, Hayat-e-Sukrat, Tazkiratul-Fujala, Masajid-e-Dhaka
- Movement: Khilafat Movement
- Awards: Shifaul Mulk

Hakim Habibur Rahman (Bengali: হাকিম হাবিবুর রহমান, Urdu: حکیم حبیب الرحمن; 23 March 1881 – 23 February 1947) was an Unani physician, litterateur, journalist, politician, and chronicler in early 20th-century Dhaka.

Rahman was a close associate of Nawab Sir Khwaja Salimullah of the Dhaka Nawab Family. His two chronicles of Dhaka, Asudegan-e-Dhaka and Dhaka Panchas Baras Pahle, remain important primary source material for researchers working on Dhaka. His wide collection of manuscripts, coins, weapons, and artefacts is preserved at the Dhaka University Library as the Hakim Habibur Rahman Collection. The Hakim Habibur Rahman Lane carries his name near his birthplace, the Choto Katra, a landmark in the old part of Dhaka.

== Early life and family ==
Habibur Rahman was born on 23 March 1881 to a Sunni Muslim family of hakims in the Choto Katra mahalla of Dacca, Bengal Presidency. His father was an akhund and physician, and his ancestors had arrived in Bengal from Afghanistan.

== Medical career ==
Habibur Rahman trained for 11 years in tibb (traditional medical practice) and the Unani system of medicine at Kanpur, Lucknow, Delhi, and Agra after completing his studies at Dhaka Madrasah. He established his own practice in 1904. In 1939, he was awarded the title of Shifaul Mulk for his contribution in the field of Unani medicine by the British government.

== Social and political work ==
Habibur Rahman was a prominent leader of the Khilafat Movement in East Bengal. In the 1920s and '30s, he performed as a major arbitrator for the Sardar community of Dhaka, who were the traditional leaders of the Panchayet system of local government of Dhaka. He edited Al Mashriq, an Urdu monthly journal, in 1906, and launched another Urdu monthly, Jadu, together with Khwaja Adel in 1924. In 1930, he founded the Tibbia Habibia College in Dacca, which is one of the oldest medical colleges and the oldest Unani medical college in Bangladesh. This was not only a college, it was the pioneer of Unani medicine revolution in Bangladesh. Hakim Habibur Rahman is still remembered and respected for this establishment. Tibbia Habibia College has been producing Unani physicians with the title DUMS (Diploma in Unani Medicine and Surgery). It has designed and formed a Unani medical college under Dhaka University, which has been producing BUMS (Bachelor of Unani Medicine and Surgery) physicians for the country.

Apart from his general support to the Dacca Museum, he donated 231 old coins, some of gold and silver, to the museum in 1936.

== Literary work ==
A notable Urdu journalist and writer in turn of the century Dhaka, Habibur Rahman wrote extensively, often under the takhallus (pen name) of Ahsan (meaning "mercy"). Apart from the celebrated Asudegan-e-Dhaka (1946) and Dhaka Panchas Baras Pahle (1949), his other major works include Al-Fariq (1904), Socrates' biography Hayat-e-Sukrat (1904), Tazkiratul-Fujala, and Masajid-e-Dhaka. He collected all the Arabic, Persian, and Urdu books written in Bengal for more than 40 years and published a catalogue titled Sulasa Ghusala. He compiled the correspondence of Mirza Ghalib and Khwaja Haider Jan Shayek, a 19th-century Urdu poet from Dhaka, in Inshaye Shayek. He was the founder secretary of Anjuman-e-Urdu, an organisation established to provide a forum for Urdu in Eastern Bengal and Assam.

== Hakim Habibur Rahman Foundation ==
The Hakim Habibur Rahman Foundation was established in 1994 in his memory. The scope of the foundation includes research on and promotion of herbal and Unani medicine, establishment of charitable institutions on traditional medical studies and exchange of knowledge, awards of merit, organisation of seminars and symposia, and promotion of Rahman's social and intellectual ideals. Hakim Syed Zillur Rahman from India is one of the recipients of the foundation's 'awards of merit' in 1996.

== Death ==
Habibur Rahman died on 23 February 1947 in Dacca. As per his will, his janaza was conducted by Abdul Wahhab Pirji.
