= Sardari system =

The Sardari system (Bengali: সরদারী প্রথা) refers to the panchayat system used in the city of Dhaka (present-day Bangladesh) from the second half of the nineteenth century. The system developed during under the Nawabs of Dhaka. In this state-recognised practice, a five-member committee was formed in each mahalla of the city, consisting of local influential Muslims who would take care of the minor issues of the mahalla. The chief of the mahalla committee was referred to as the Sardar. The Sardar was appointed for life, and after his death, his son was usually the next Sardar. The Nawab of Dhaka used to give approval and formal recognition to the family panchayat committee.

== History ==
Although the exact date of the introduction of the Sardari system is not known, many believe that it started during the Mughal rule and then developed during the British Raj. The British government recognised the Sardari system after the introduction of the Nawab of Dhaka, in order to maintain the social order of the Dhaka metropolis and to maintain the Nawab's allegiance to the government. In 1876, under Nawab Khwaja Abdul Ghani, the importance of this panchayat system increased and at that time there were a total of 12 panchayat committees in Dhaka. During the time of Nawab Khwaja Salimullah, a further 22 committees were attached to it and the system was restructured. In 1907, Salimullah appointed his brother-in-law Khwaja Muhammad Azam as the Supervisor of all the Panchayat Committees of Dhaka. Under Azam, there were 133 sardars leading 133 committees. He wrote a book in Urdu titled Islami Panchayet Dhaka in 1911.

This system was in place for 80 years in Dhaka. Along with the abolishment of the zamindari system, this Sardari system was also abolished as part of the East Bengal State Acquisition and Tenancy Act of 1950. Among the notable Sardars of Dhaka were Jumman Sardar, Pearu Sardar, Moti Sardar, Safar Ali Sardar, Mirza Qadir Sardar, Mawla Bakhsh Sardar, Majid Sardar and Latif Khan Sardar. 2016 marked the death of the last living Sardar of Dhaka, Akhtar Sardar.

== Activities ==
Panchayat committees usually played a role in resolving various family, social, property inheritance and personal disputes through arbitration meetings. Different types of social ceremonies were also celebrated in this manner. Generally, any decision was followed by all parties and if anyone disobeyed, there was a system of local punishment.

== See also ==
- Mahifarash, Dhakaiya fishmonger community headed by a sardar
