= Old Dhaka =

Historical territory of the city of Dhaka

Old Dhaka পুরান ঢাকা
- Region
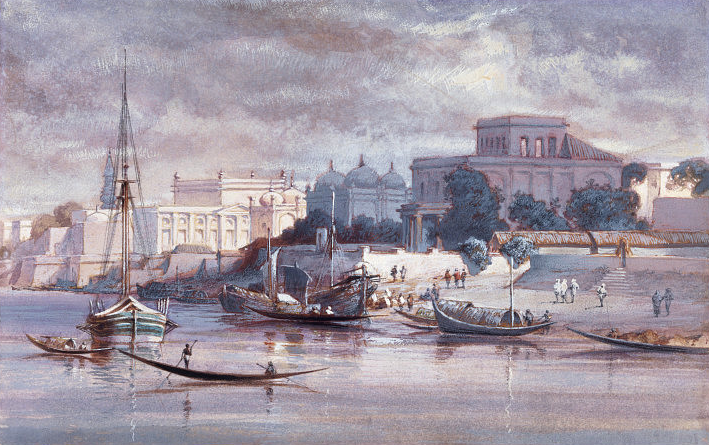
- Dhaka City across Buriganga River in a 1861 painting

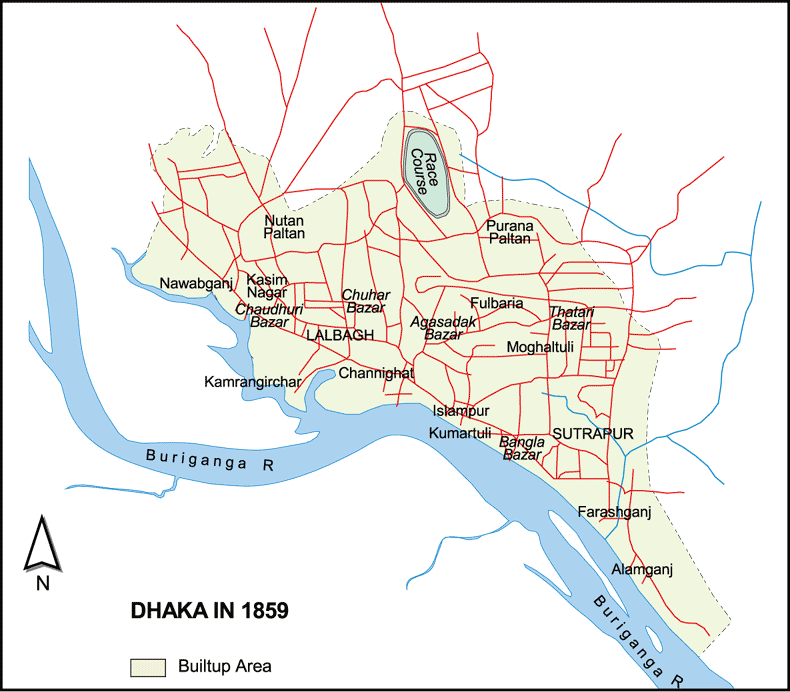
- Map of Old Dhaka during British rule
- Coordinates: 23°42′25″N 90°24′34″E
- Country: Bangladesh
- District: Dhaka District
- City Corporation: Dhaka South City Corporation
- Settlement: Around 500 BC
- Establishment: 1608 CE
- Expansion: After 1910 CE

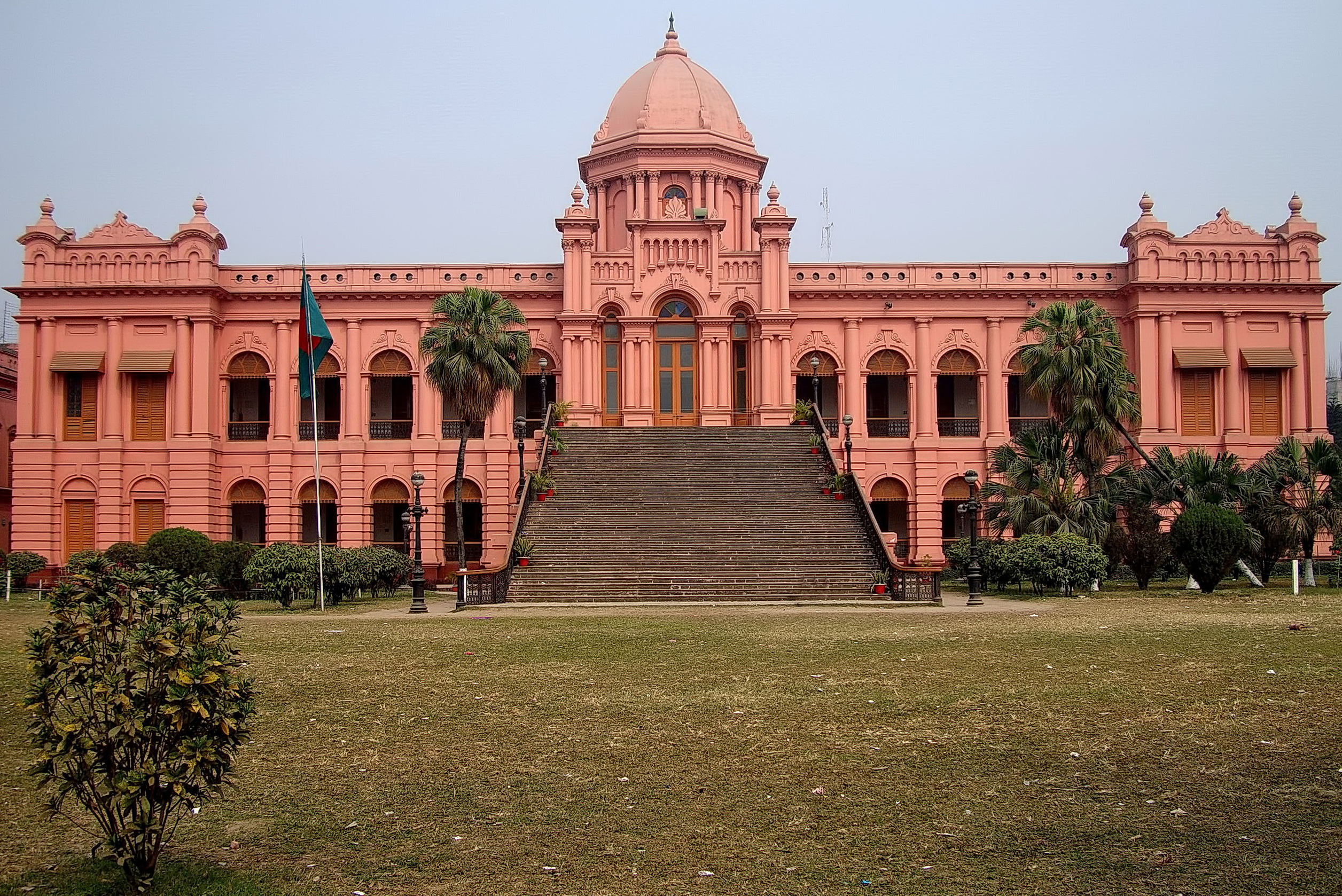
Ahsan Manzil, the abode of the Nawabs of Dhaka

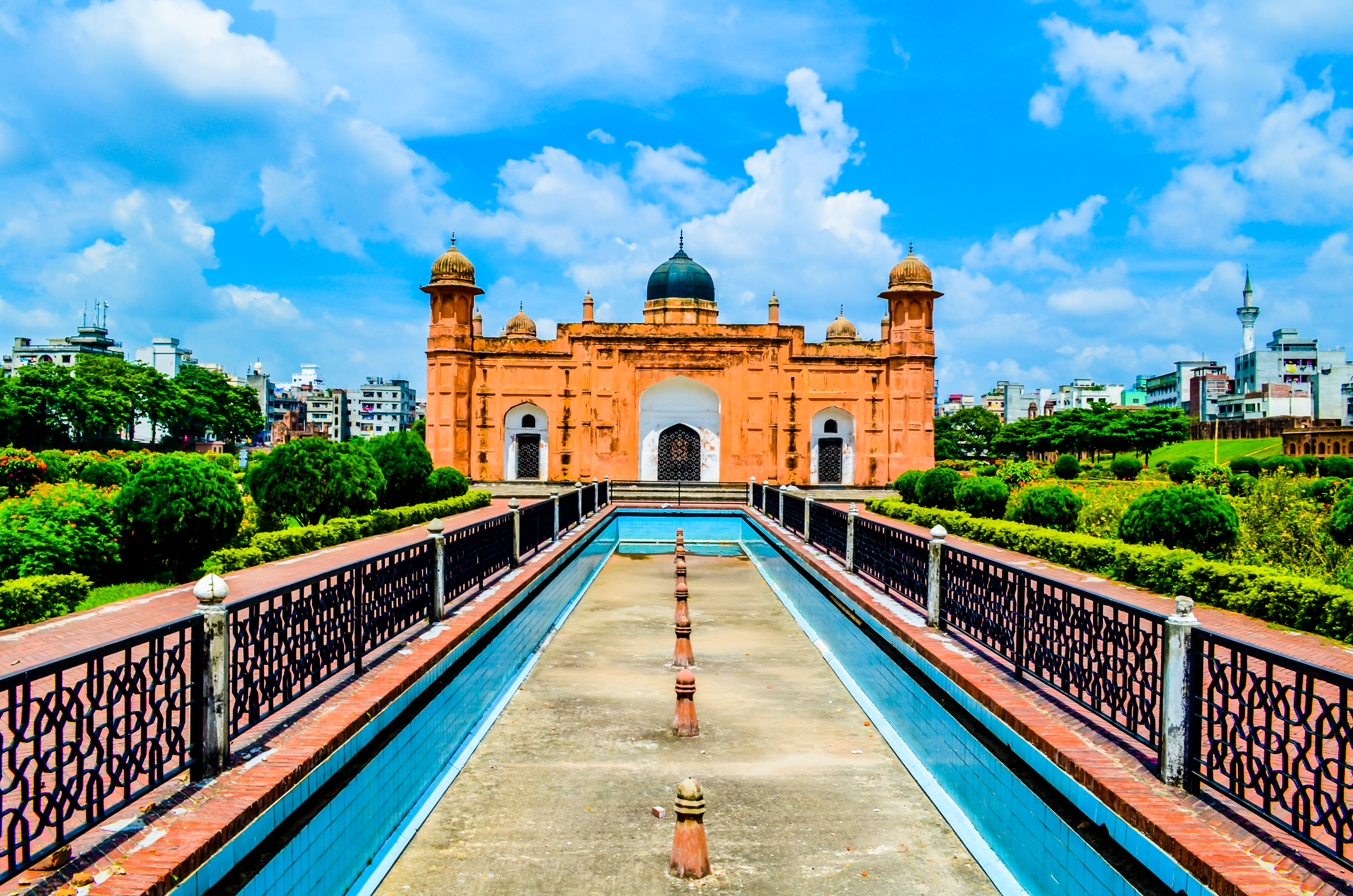
Lalbagh Fort

Old Dhaka (Bengali: পুরান ঢাকা, romanized: Purān Ḍhākā) is a term used to refer to the historic old city of Dhaka, the capital of Bangladesh. Located on the banks of the Buriganga River, it was one of the largest and most prosperous cities of the Indian subcontinent, and the center of the worldwide muslin trade.

The city was founded in 1608, named Jahangirnagar (Bengali: জাহাঙ্গীরনগর, romanized: Jāhāṅgīrnôgôr, lit. 'City of Jahangir'), after the then Mughal emperor Jahangir. It was the capital of the Mughal Province of Bengal, until Subahdar (later Nawab) Murshid Quli Khan shifted the capital to Murshidabad in the early-18th century. With the rise of Calcutta (now Kolkata) during the British Raj, Dhaka began to decline and came to be known as the "City of Magnificent Ruins". The British, however, began to develop the modern city in the mid-19th century.

Old Dhaka is famous for its variety of foods and the amicable living of people of all religions in harmony. The main Muslim festivals celebrated with fanfare here are Eid-ul-Fitr, Eid-ul-Adha; then there is the Ashura, a day of commemoration and mourning, respectively, for Sunni and Shia Muslims. Hindu festivals like Durga Puja, Kali Puja, and Saraswati Puja are also celebrated with enthusiasm. The festivals which are celebrated by all religious communities with much splendor include Shakrain, Pohela Falgun, and Halkhata. Demographically, the old Dhaka is predominantly Muslim, while a significant number of Hindus also reside here. Its inhabitants are known as the demonym Dhakaiya or "Dhakaites".

== History ==
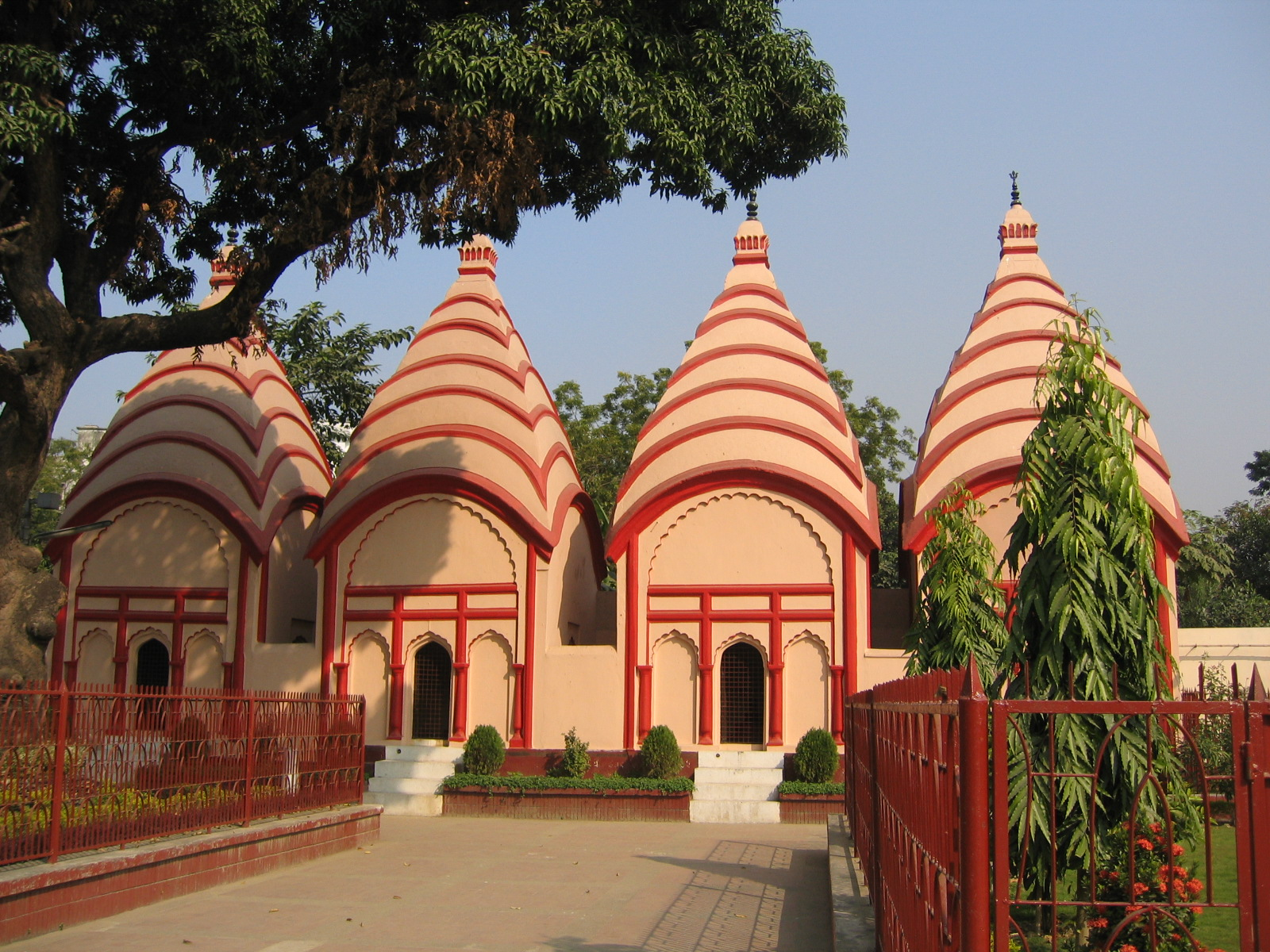
Dhakeshwari National Temple

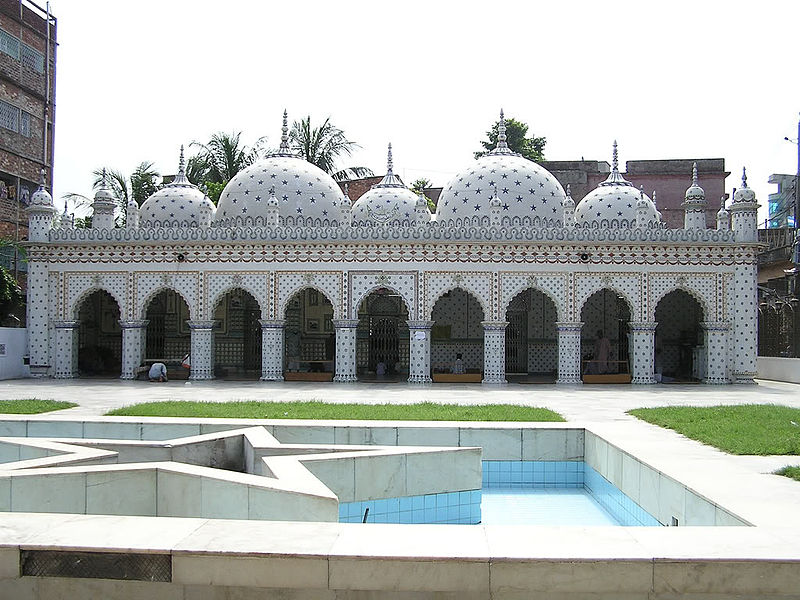
Star Mosque, Armanitola

The existence of a settlement in the area that is now Dhaka dates from 500 BC to 200 BC. The city area was ruled by the ancient Mahishya kingdom's of Vanga, the Buddhist/Hindu kingdom of Kamarupa, the Pala Empire and the Chandra dynasty, before passing to the control of the Hindu Mahishya Sena dynasty in the 10th century. The name of the town may have derived from the establishment of the Goddess Dhakeshvari's temple by Ballal Sena in the 12th century. Dhaka was ruled by the Hindu Deva dynasty of Bikrampur after the fall of the Sena dynasty.

After the Islamic Victory in Bengal, the area came under the reign of the Delhi Sultanate (sometimes tenuously), then by the Bengal Sultanate, before being taken over by the Mughals in the 1576. Dhaka started to grow from 1610 under the Mughal Subedars. The oldest standing mosque was built in 1454 by Bakht Binat during the rule of Nasiruddin Mahmud Shah.

The development of townships and housing has resulted in a significant growth in population, as the city was proclaimed the capital (replacing Rajmahal) of the Bengal Subah under Mughal rule in 1608. Mughal Subahdar Islam Khan was the first administrator of the city. Khan named the town "Jahangirabad" (জাহাঙ্গীরাবাদ; City of Jahangir) in honour of the Mughal Emperor Jahangir, although this name was dropped soon after Jahangir's death. Farashganj (French town) was settled by the French in 1780, then known as French Market. The area is known for its 19th and early 20th century mansions. Farashganj also had the presence of the French East India Company. The 18th and 19th centuries saw a significant number of Armenians settle down in Armanitola, then a predominantly Armenian neighborhood. There is an Armenian Church in Armanitola. The British converted an old Afghan fort into a Central Jail in 1820. Das Babu, prominent Mahishya merchant had a daughter Indira, whose tomb is present here. Indira road is named after her and not after Indira Gandhi as some mistakenly believe it to be. Pogose School, was founded by Armenian businessman Nicholas Pogose, as the first private school in Dhaka. The national political party, Bangladesh Awami League, was founded in Rose Garden Palace on 23 June 1949.

=== 21st Century ===
The area saw rise in drug abuse, especially Ya Ba and Phensedyl. Old Dhaka has a large number of chemical, plastic, electrical goods factories, and printing presses. The government of Bangladesh is trying to relocate them out of Old Dhaka. In 2010 a fire that was flamed by chemical warehouse killed more than hundred people and increased the calls for chemical factories and warehouse to be moved from the area. The narrow lanes make it difficult for fire trucks to reach fires in the area and many of them are too narrow to even fit a fire truck. Dhaka's Third Special Judge's Couert is located in Bakshibazar, Old Dhaka. Ansarullah Bangla Team attacked a police check post, leaving two cops injured and the capture of one terrorist on 1 February 2017. It fell under the jurisdiction of Dhaka South City Corporation after the administrative division of Dhaka.

=== Conservation ===
Many of the British and Mughal era buildings of old Dhaka face the risk of being knocked down to be replaced with modern apartment buildings. Conservationist are trying to preserve them but the government of Bangladesh has shown little interest in preserving them. The government declared Shankhari Bazaar a heritage site in 2013, which met resistance from the residents who wanted to expand the buildings. In 2014 a mosque built in the place of 1707 construction, which was demolished leading to controversy and criticism. Government run schools are in a depleted condition in Old Dhaka as of 2015. In 2016 the three hundred-year-old Gorostan Shahi Mosque was demolished to build a new structure. Many of the buildings are demolished because RAJUK and the Archaeological Department of the government did not list them as historical buildings which would have protected them.

== Culture ==
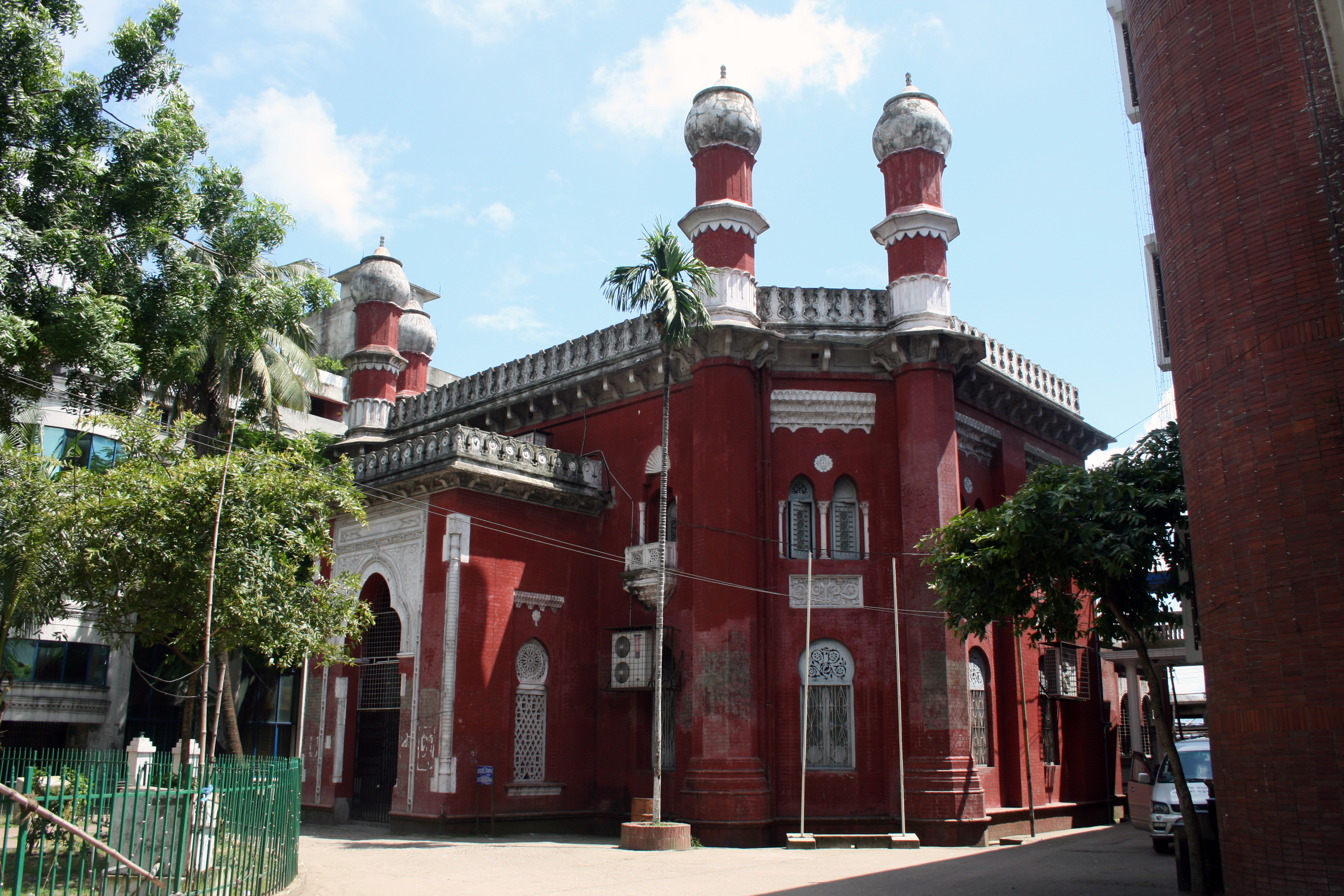
Northbrook Hall

=== Architecture ===
Bahadur Shah Park is a 19th-century park that serves as an exercise ground for the residents. Sadarghat is the river terminal of Dhaka City. Shankhari Bazaar is a historically Hindu neighborhood known for its Shakhari (conch musical instrument) makers. The Shakhari also make bangles from the shells. The shops are in decline as many news to buy cheaper bangles made from artificial shell. Northbrook Hall auditorium was founded in 1881; it holds art exhibitions. Pohela Falgun is celebrated in old Dhaka. Bulbul Academy of Fine Arts is a historic art school in Old Dhaka. The Dhaka Central Jail, which has been closed down now houses a museum. The jail was founded in 1788 as a criminal ward. when it closed in 2016 it housed over 8 thousand prisoners. Shakrain is a festival of kite in Old Dhaka. It marks the end of Poush, the first month of winter in Bangladesh. It also involves rooftop parties, fire-breathing, and fireworks. Bongshal Pond is Tanti Bazaar is a community pool and gathering spot. Chaand Raat (the night before eid) is celebrated here with fireworks and Adda (hangout). Taazia processions are held by Shia Muslims on the occasion of Muharram near Hossaaini and Barha Katra. There are 12 musical schools in Old Dhaka. Old Dhaka has a sense of community where neighbors know each other and that differentiate it from new Dhaka. During Durge Puja some parts of Old Dhaka are brightly decorated and people play drums in the streets.

=== Food ===
Old Dhaka is famous for its biriyani, morog polau, and kebabs. Morog (Chicken) polau is set apart from traditional biriyani in its use of turmeric and malai (cream of milk) together. An old specialty is bakarkhani with ‘kata moshlar mangsho' is meat cooked with whole spices not powder or paste. Farukul er muri (puffed rice) a venture that started in the 1980s. Other well known dishes include "glassy beef" which is beef with a thick layer of oil on top giving it a glassy appearance. Sheer khorma is a desert item that uses a variety of nuts. Nihari and kacchi biryani are Mughal dishes famous in old Dhaka. Kazi Alauddin Road and Chawkbazar are known for their road side stalls selling traditional iftar items during Ramadan. Boro baper polay khai, made with minced meat, chick peas, eggs, potatoes and 13 different spices, is a Ramadan specialty. Faluda is a traditional iftar desert and lassi is a specialty drink. Shab-e-Barat is celebrated with roti with Halwa, ornate breads, and breads shaped like fish. Kala Bhuna, a beef dish, was created in Old Dhaka and is a speciality of the area. Old Dhaka is home to the historic Prince of Wales bakery, established in the 1850s in Lakshmi Bazaar by a man from Wales. The bakery has been owned by three generations of the same family.

Local famous foods are:

- Haji Biriyani
- Bakarkhani
- Beauty Lachchi
- Royel Nehari
- Nawab Kachchi

=== Sports ===
Farashganj SC founded in 1959 and Rahmatganj MFS founded in 1933 are two major Old Dhaka-based association football teams. East End Club, founded in 1933, is one of the top sports clubs in Dhaka producing players like Aminul Islam Bulbul.

=== Education ===
The area has well known schools like Dhaka Collegiate School, Pogos High School Dhaka govt Muslim high school, St. Gregory's High School & College, K. L. Jubilee High School & College Bangla Bazar Govt. Girls High School and St. Francis Xavier's Girls School & College, Kabi Nazrul Govt. College. Jagannath University is a leading public university in the country located at Old Dhaka. Dhaka College campus was initially located at Dhaka Collegiate School premise before moving to its current location. Sir Salimullah Medical College was founded in 1875 in Old Dhaka; its hospital wing is Mitford Hospital.

=== Languages ===
Bengali language is predominantly spoken by the people of Old Dhaka. The most prominent Bengali dialects of this region are Urban East Bengali Colloquial dialect and Dhakaiya Kutti, spoken by the local Bengalis of Old Dhaka in Bangladesh. Dhakaiya Urdu, a dialect of Urdu, mainly spoken by Khusbas community and the members of Nawab Family of Dhaka. The Bihari refugees of Old Dhaka also speak a colloquial dialect of Urdu.

== Economy ==
Dholaikhal in old Dhaka has large number of light engineering firms. The government is also trying to remove chemical factories from Old Dhaka. Counterfeit cosmetics for Dhaka are made in neighborhoods in Old Dhaka.

== Neighborhoods ==
- Posta
- Becharam Dewry
- Chowk Bazaar
- Shankhari Bazaar
- Luxmibazar
- Banglabazar
- Sutrapur
- Jaluanagar
- Banianagar
- Goalnagar
- Tantibazar
- Sutarnagar
- Kamarnagar
- Patuatuli
- Armanitolla
- Sadarghat
- Bangsal
- Babubazaar
- Wari
- Begumbazaar
- Lalbagh
- Hazaribagh
- Kotwali
- Dholaikhal
- Gendaria
- Faridabad
- Bakshibazar

== Administration ==
Old Dhaka consists of 8 metropolitan thanas- Hazaribagh, Lalbagh, Chowkbazar, Bangsal, Kotwali (Dhaka Sadar), Wari, Sutrapur and Gendaria. Old Dhaka is under the administration of Dhaka South City Corporation. Old Dhaka is bounded by the areas of Mohammadpur on the west, Dhanmondi, New Market, Shahbagh, Ramna, Motijheel and Sabujbagh on the north, Jatrabari and Shyampur on the east, adding also Kamrangir Char Thana and Keraniganj Upazila on the south.

=== Government ===
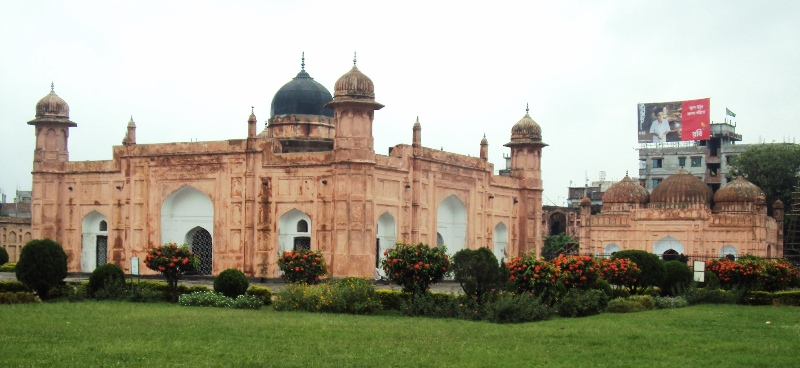
A side view of the Lalbagh Fort

Old Dhaka falls under the control Dhaka South City Corporation.

== Landmarks ==
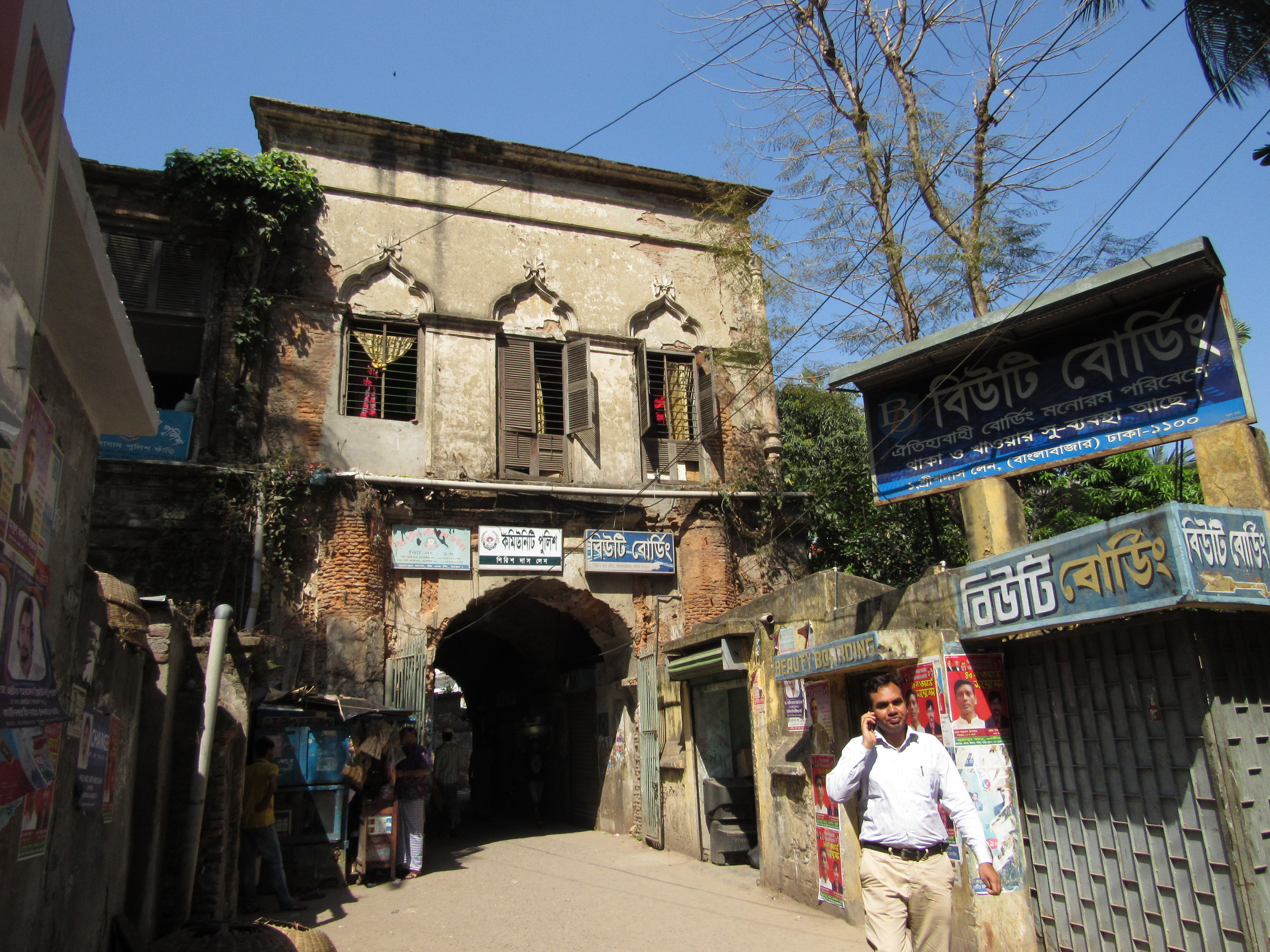
Beauty Boarding

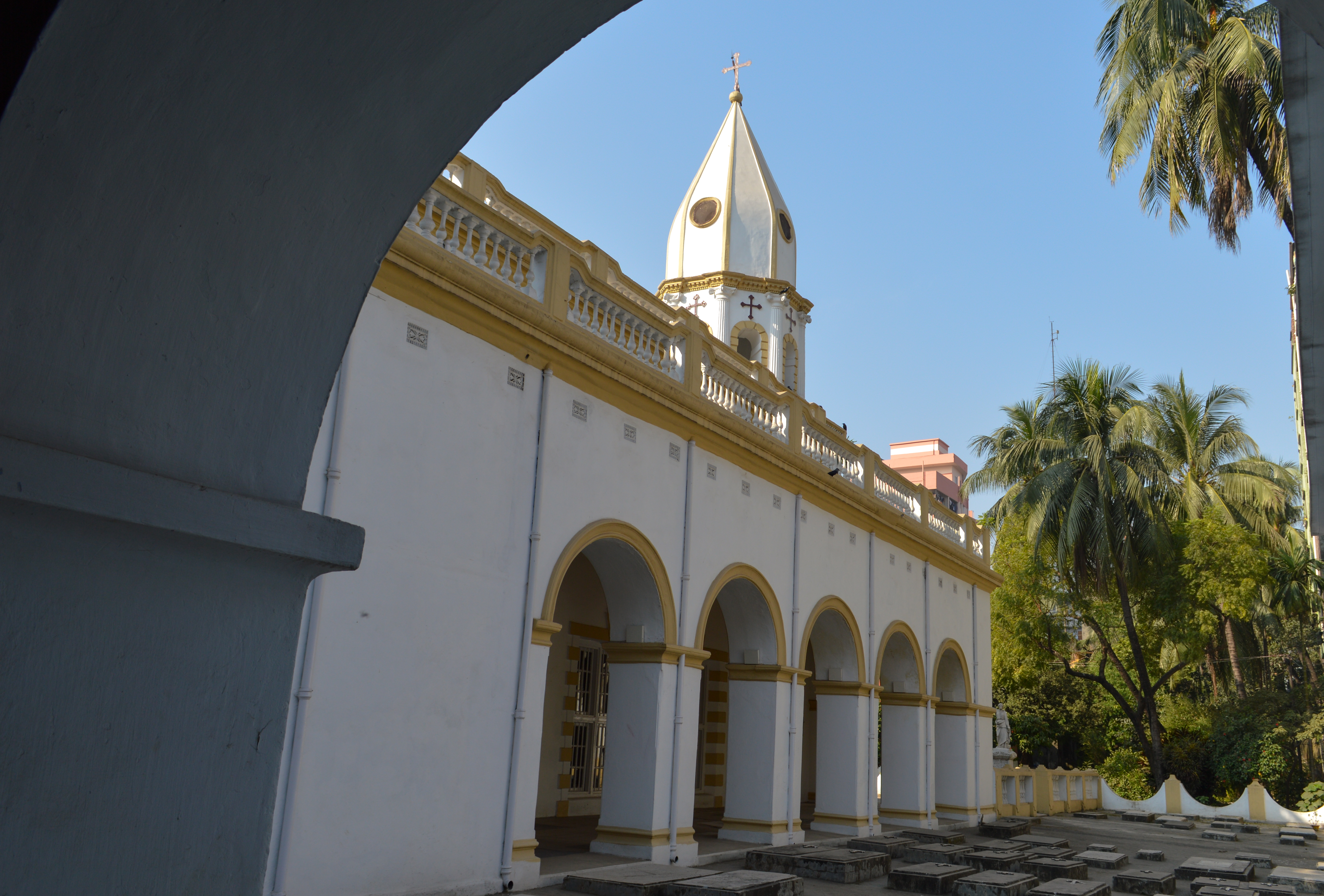
Armenian Church

List of landmarks in this region:

- Greek monument in Dhaka University with the preserved nine gravestones of the old Greek Community.
- Northbrook Hall (Lal kuthi) built during the British Raj period to host the reception of the Viceroy of India Lord Northbrook. It has both Mughal and European architectural elements in its design.
- Lalbagh Fort
- Chowk Bazaar Shai Mosque
- Dhakeshwari Temple is the national temple of Bangladesh, it was built in the 12th century.
- Hussaini Dalan
- Armenian Church the Church was built in 1798 by the Armenian community in Dhaka.
- Mitford Hospital was built in the mid-1800s on land donated by Robert Mitford, who was a Tax collector of Dhaka. Before the establishment of the hospital, this land was the site of the Dutch settlement and trading post.
- Tara mosque (the Star Mosque)- The mosque was built in 1711 by Mirza Gulam Pir, a Mughal landlord. The domes of the mosque were made with imported marbles from India. In 1926 Ali Jaan Bepari, a merchant, imported China clay to renovate the mosque. The mosque has a star shaped fountain and the china clay with star shaped patterns. The china clay is unique among mosques in Bangladesh.
- Ahsan Manzil was the former residence of the Nawab of Dhaka. It was nationalized in 1952 and turned into a museum.
- Bara Katra was built by Prince Shah Shuja, son of Mughal emperor Shah Jahan in 1644. He was the Mughal Governor of Bengal. He never lived in the palace which functioned as a guesthouse.
- Choto Katra was built by another Mughal governor Shaista Khan in 1663. The interior houses the tomb of Chompa Bibi after whom the locality Champatoli is named.
- Rose Garden Palace - The palace was built by Hrishikesh Das. He was lower caste Hindu Zamidar, who built this palace after being insulted by a higher caste Hindu in a party. He sold the mansion in 1936 to Khan Bahadur Kazi Abdur Rashid, whose family sold it to the government.
- Ramakrishna Temple - Built in 1916 by Swami Brahmananda, first president of the influential Hindu religious and spiritual organisation Ramakrishna Mission.

== Gallery ==
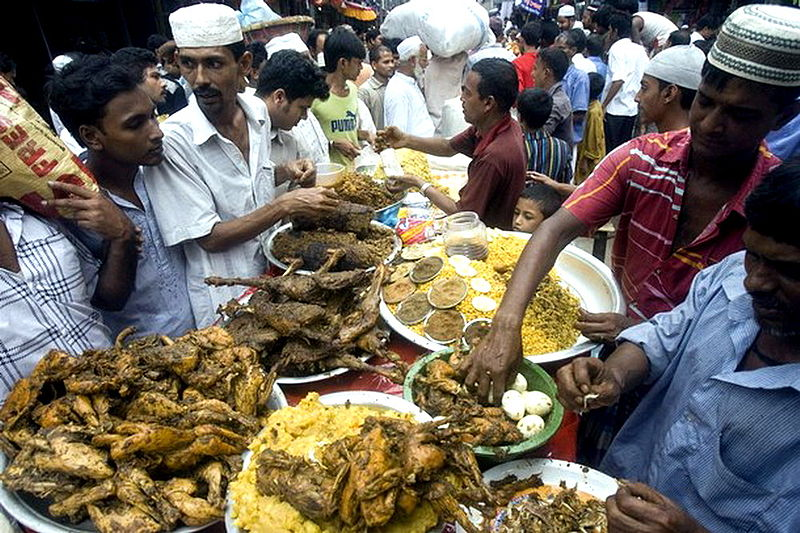
Traditional Iftaari of Chowkbazar

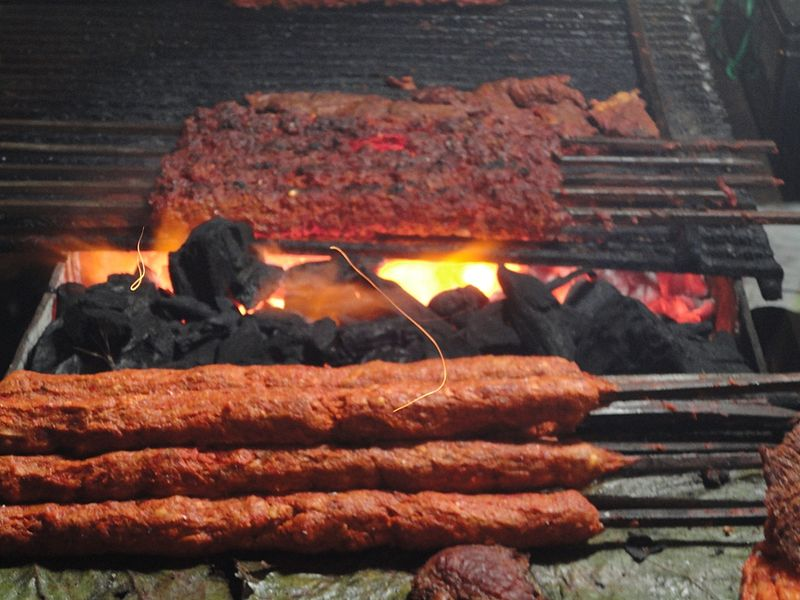
Sheek Kebab

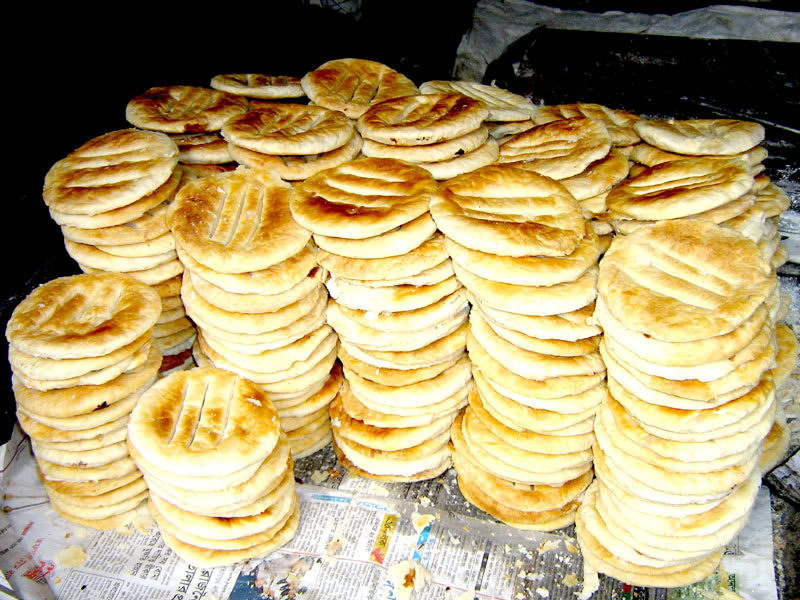
Bakarkhani

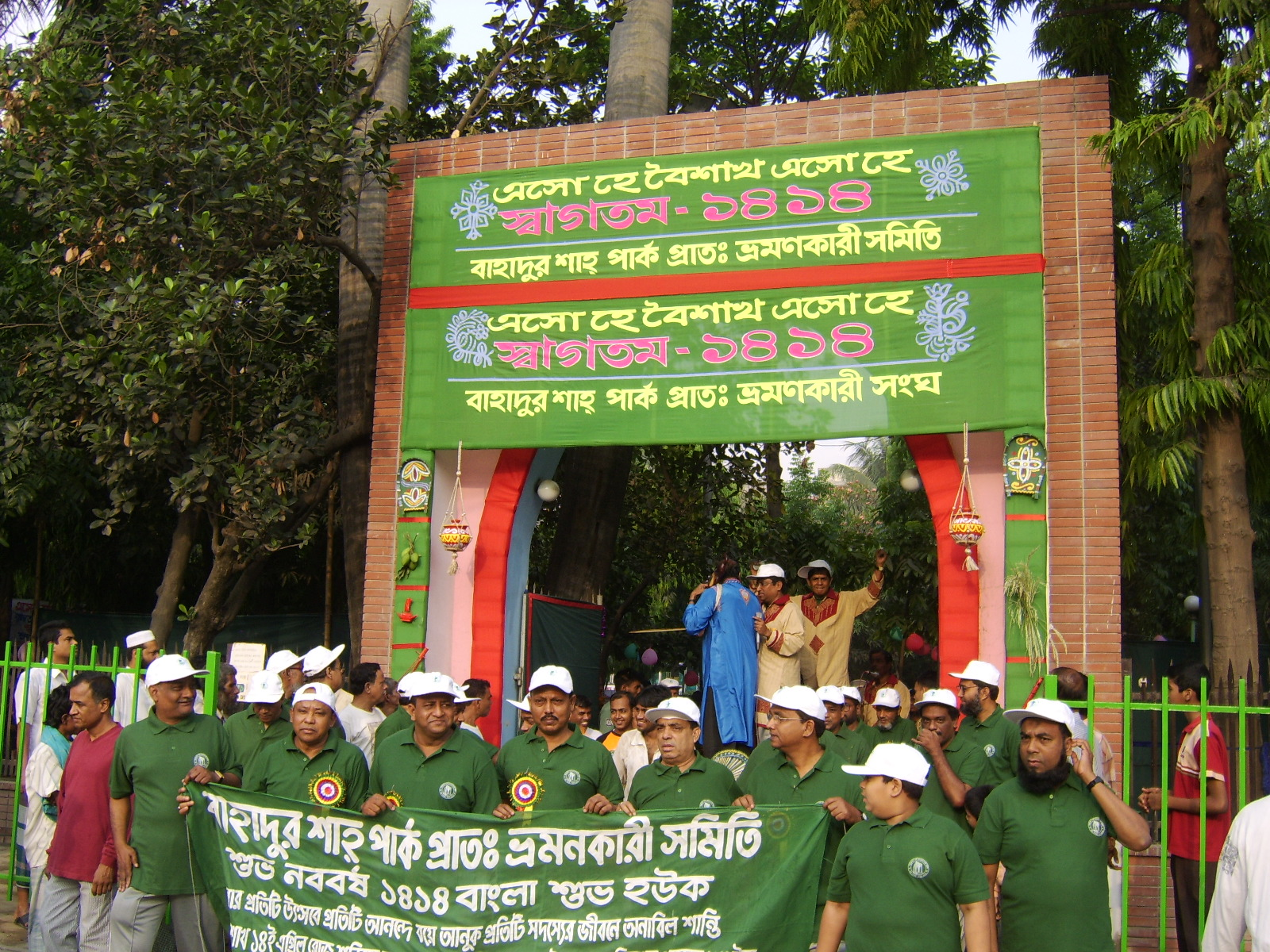
Pohela Boishakh in Bahadur Shah Park

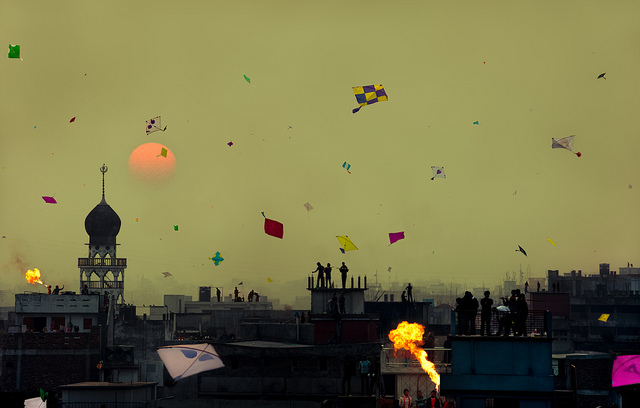
Shakrain (Poush Sangkranti)

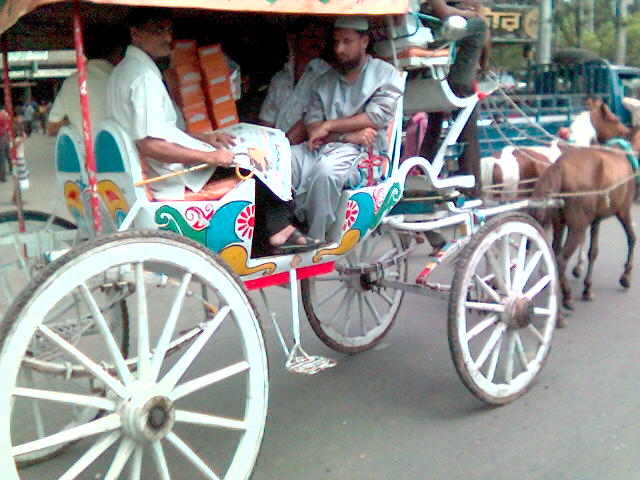
Traditional TomTom

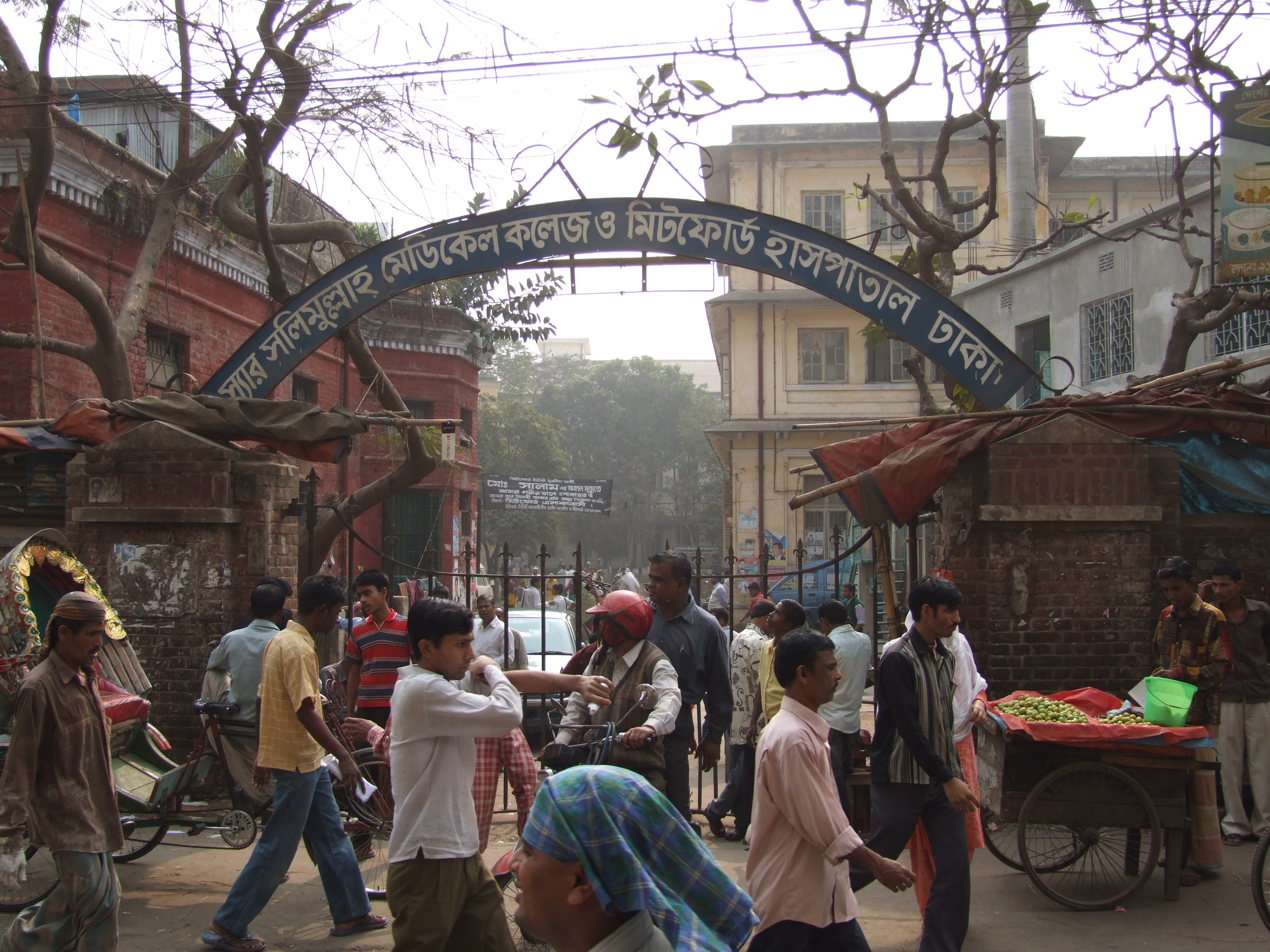
Main Entrance of Mitford Hospital

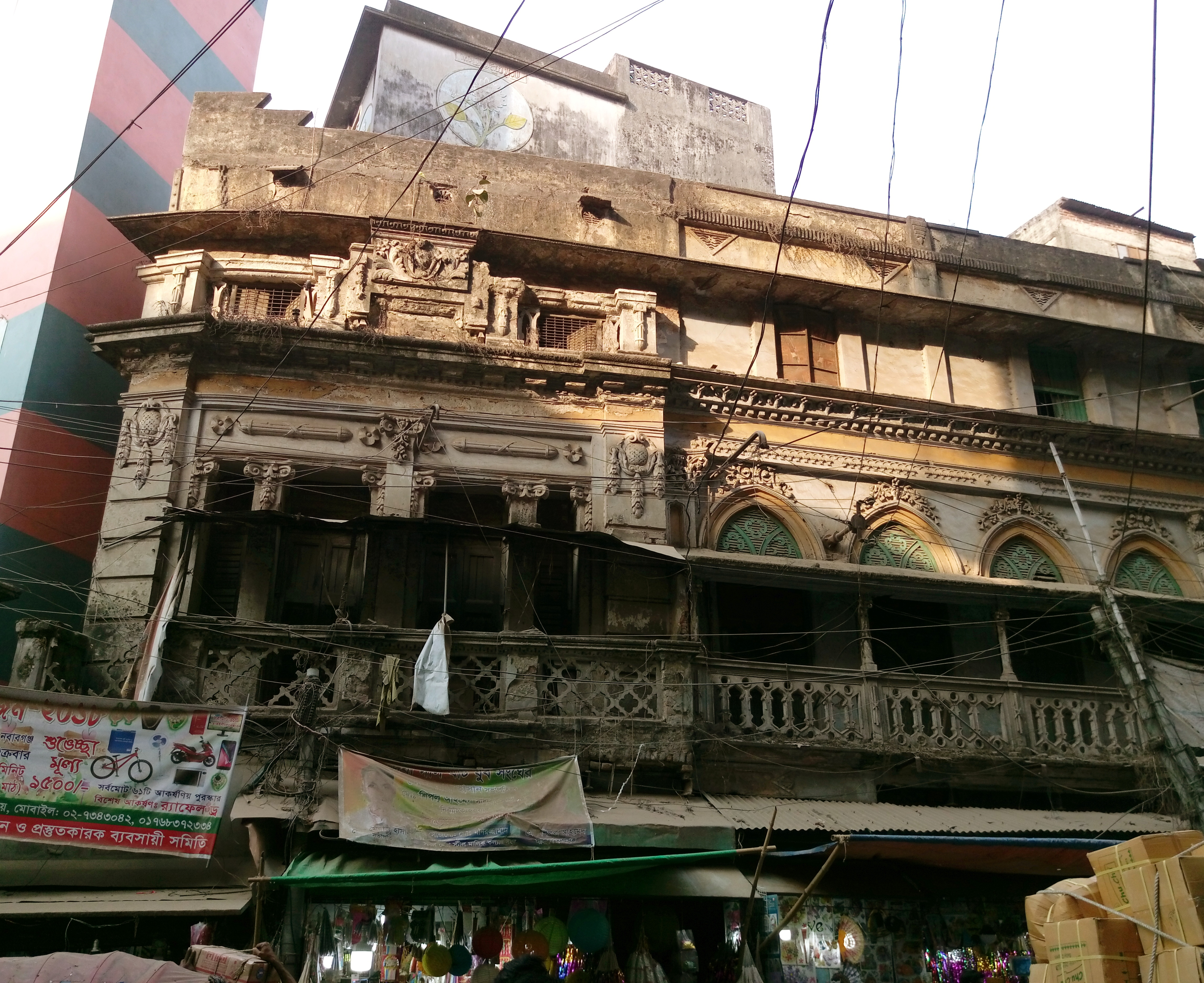
A building of Old Dhaka

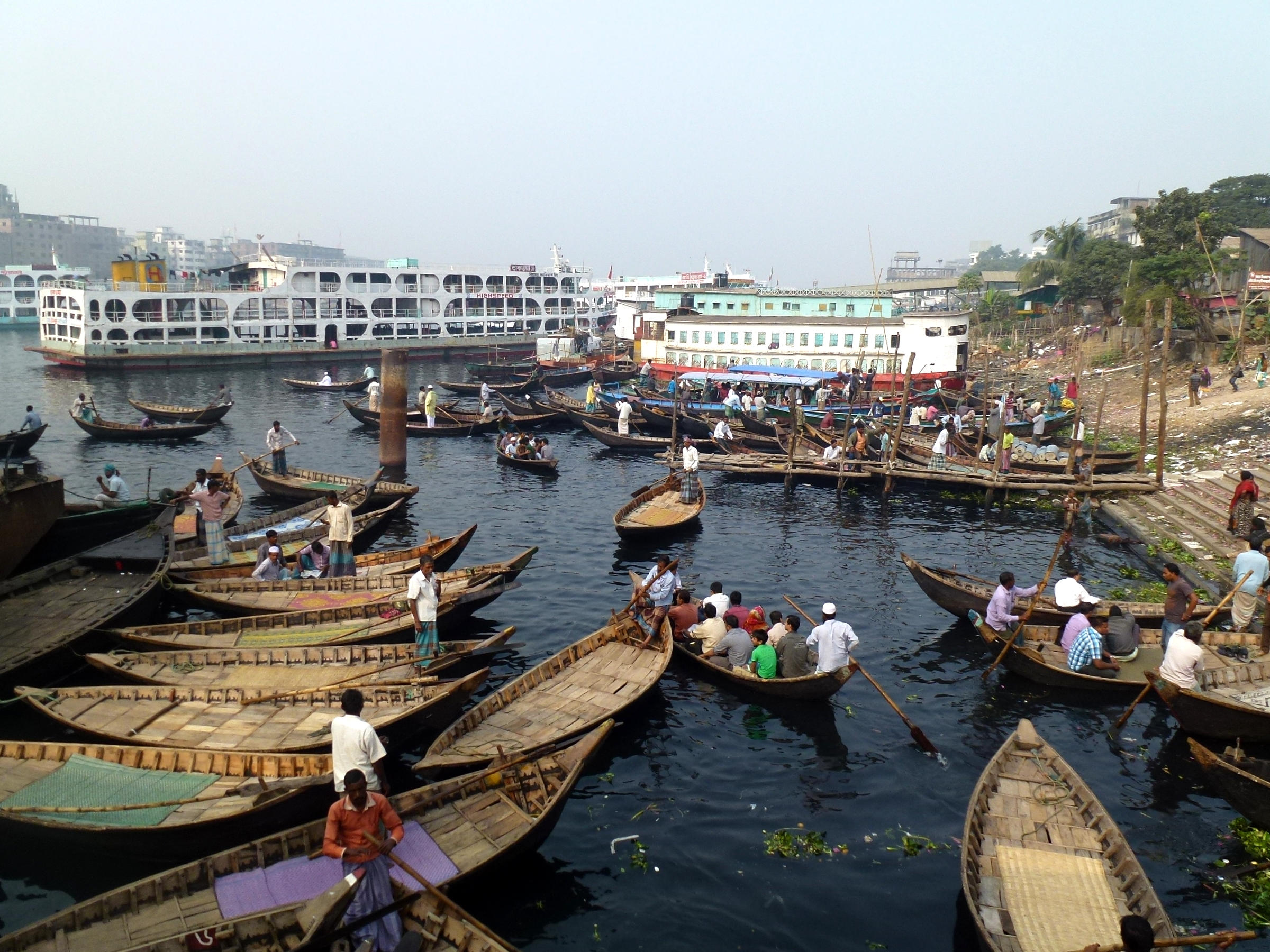
Sadarghat, Part of Old Dhaka

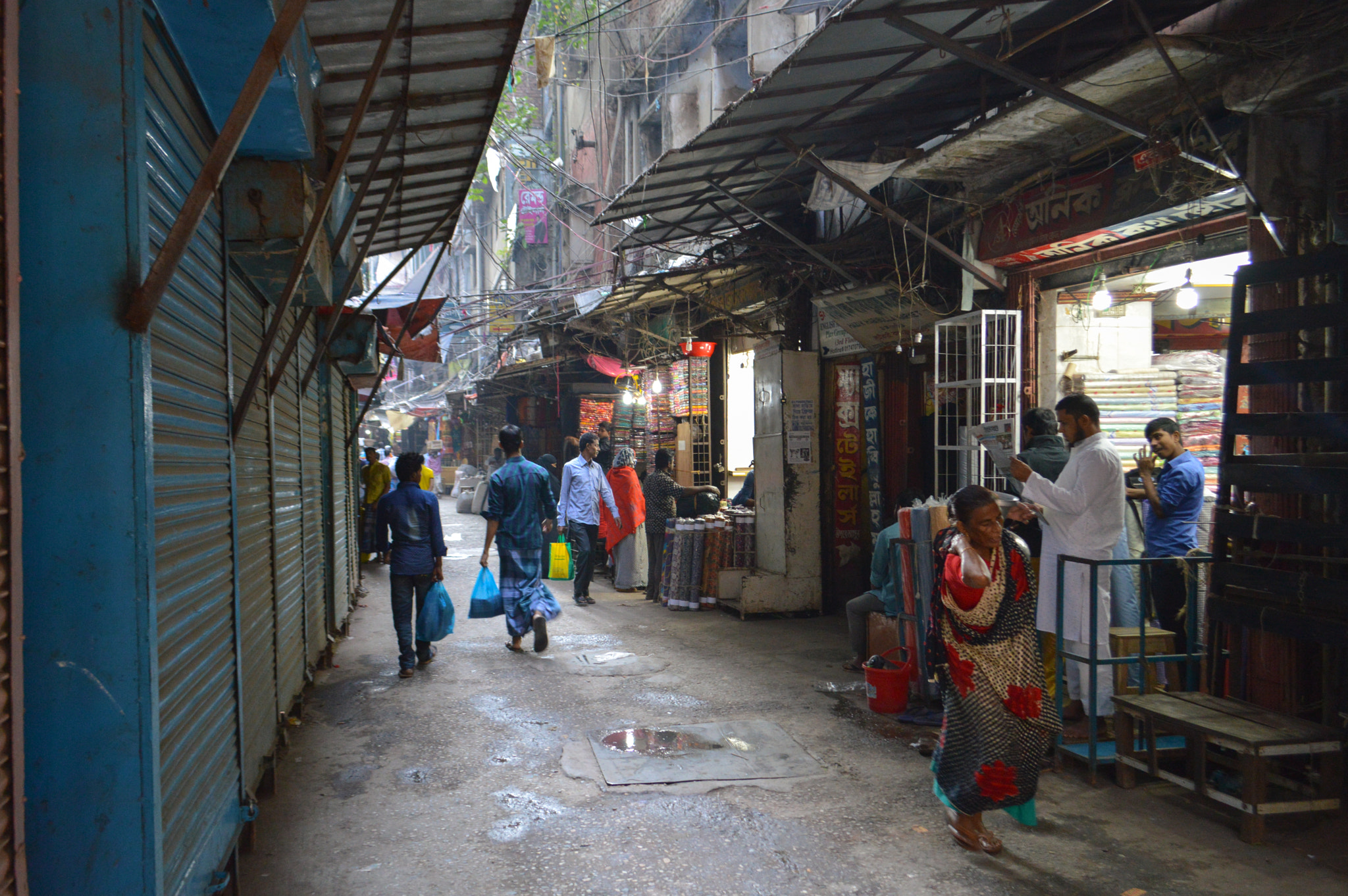
Alley in Old Dhaka

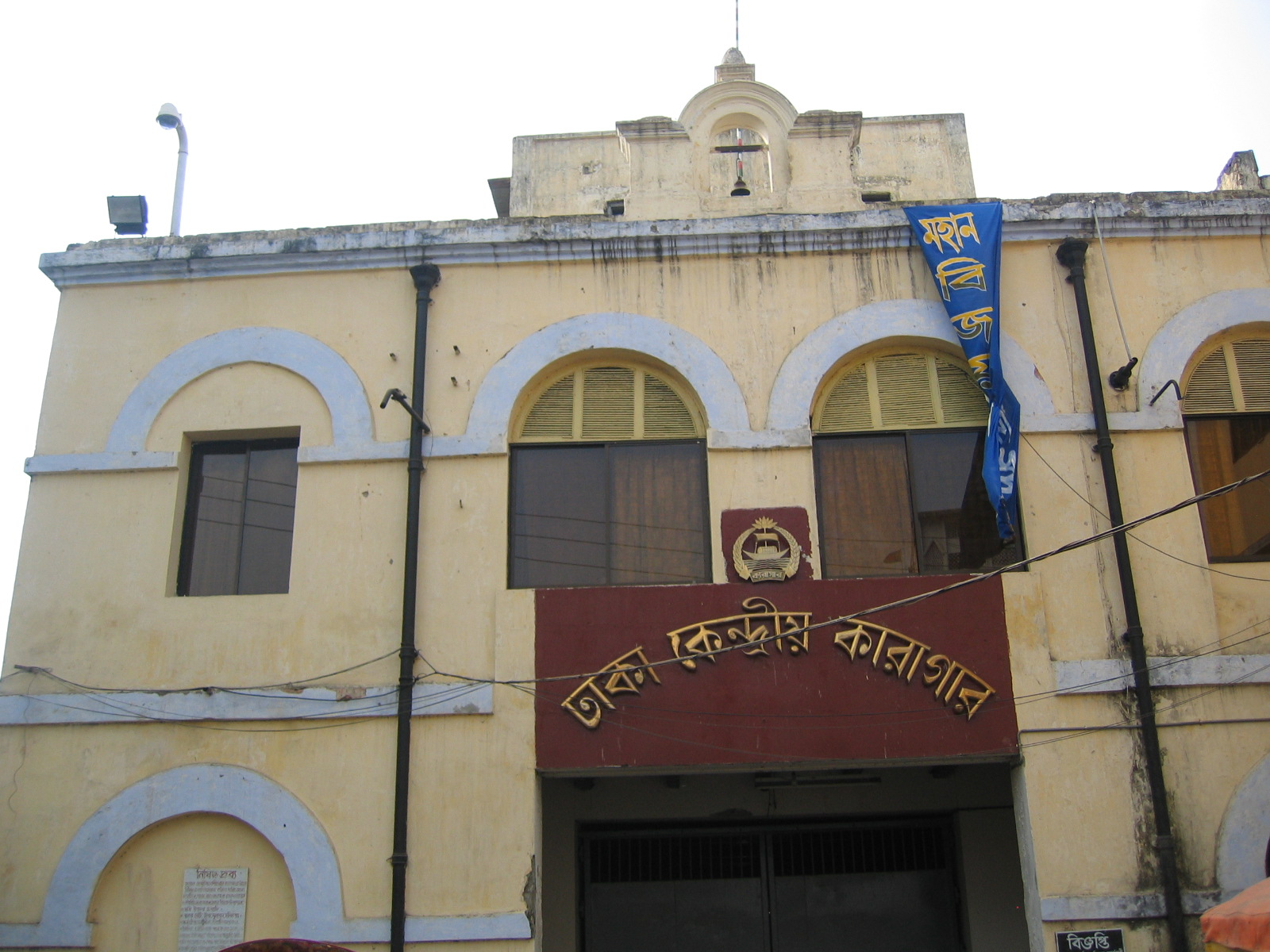
Dhaka Central Jail, Old Dhaka

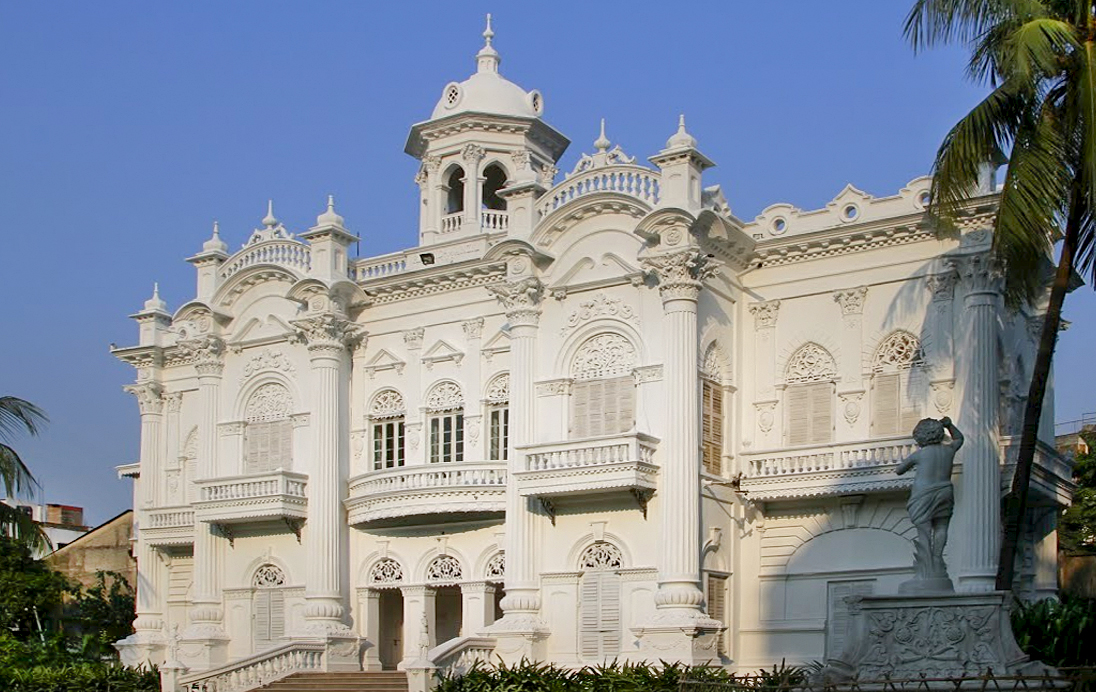
Rose Garden Palace

== See also ==
- Nawabpur Road
- Neighbourhoods in Dhaka Metropolitan Area
