= Qazi Baharul Islam =

Bangladeshi academic and former chairman

Qazi Baharul Islam is a Bangladeshi academic and former chairman of Sonali Bank, the largest bank in the country. He was the chairman during the Hallmark-Sonali Bank Loan Scam.

== Early life ==
Islam did his postgraduate studies in political science at the University of Dhaka.

== Career ==
Islam had served as the general manager of the United Kingdom branch of Sonali Bank in 1988.

From 2005 to 2007, Islam was the principal of Rupali Bank Training Academy.

After Awami League had come to power in January 2009, Islam chairman of Sonali Bank, Khondoker Bazlul Hoque chairman of Agrani Bank, and Abul Barakat chairman of Janata Bank.

The Hallmark-Sonali Bank Loan Scam refers to BDT 37 billion the Hallmark Group took as loans from Sonali Bank when Islam was chairman of the bank. Bangladesh Bank recommended the removal of all directors of Sonali Bank, but Minister of Finance Abul Maal Abdul Muhith criticised the recommendation. The Parliamentary Standing Committee on the Ministry of Finance was unhappy with the state banks and began its own investigations. The majority of the loans were disbursed from the Ruposhi Bangla Hotel branch.

A. H. M. Habibur Rahman replaced Islam as chairman of Sonali Bank on 27 December 2012, two months after his term had ended. The Awami League government was criticized over corruption in state owned banks and appointing party loyalists. The government extended the tenure of the following governors: Abul Barkat of Janata Bank, Ahmed Al-Kabir of Rupali Bank, Khondoker Bazlul Hoque of Agrani Bank, Qazi Kholiquzzaman Ahmad of Palli Karma Sahayak Foundation, and Sheikh Abdul Hye Bacchu of BASIC Bank for two years.

The Anti-Corruption Commission stopped its investigation into Islam and other former board members of Sonali Bank over the Hallmark-Sonali Bank Loan Scam in 2013 and 2014. The commission had investigated and questioned him and 11 directors of Sonali Bank. The board of directors had blamed Islam for the scam. The news site Banglanews24.com identified him as the mastermind behind embezzling money from Sonali Bank. He would openly defy Atiur Rahman, governor of Bangladesh Bank, and would overrule the board of directors of Sonali Bank.

Ahsan H. Mansur questioned why Islam and directors of Sonali Bank were not charged in March 2024. He noted that two former directors, Jannat Ara Henry and Shaimum Sarwar Kamal, had become members of parliament from the Awami League. Ahsan H. Mansur and Salehuddin Ahmed both were critical of the trials of officials of the bank, describing them as small fish, ignoring the directors.
