= St. Francis Xavier's Girls' High School =

St. Francis Xavier's Girls' School & College

Location
- 85, Luxmi Bazar; Old Dhaka area of Dhaka, Dhaka Division, 1100; Bangladesh; 23.7087°N 90.4135°E

Information
- Religious affiliations: Roman Catholic Church; Sisters of Our Lady of the Missions
- Established: 01 April 1912 (114 years ago)
- Founder: Five RNDM sisters
- School district: Dhaka
- Principal: Sister Mabel Shilpi Costa(RNDM)
- Gender: Girls
- Enrolment: 3,428
- Classes: 1-12
- Language: Bengali
- Classrooms: 45
- Campus: 1
- Affiliation: Sisters of Our Lady of the Missions
- Website: https://sfxgsc.edu.bd/

St. Francis Xavier's Girls' School & College is a Bengali-medium Catholic secondary school in the Old Dhaka area of Dhaka, Bangladesh. It is operated by the Sisters of Our Lady of the Missions, a Roman Catholic religious order.

== See also ==
- Catholic Church in Bangladesh
- Education in Bangladesh
- List of schools in Bangladesh
