= Rose Garden Palace =

Mansion and garden in Old Dhaka, Bangladesh

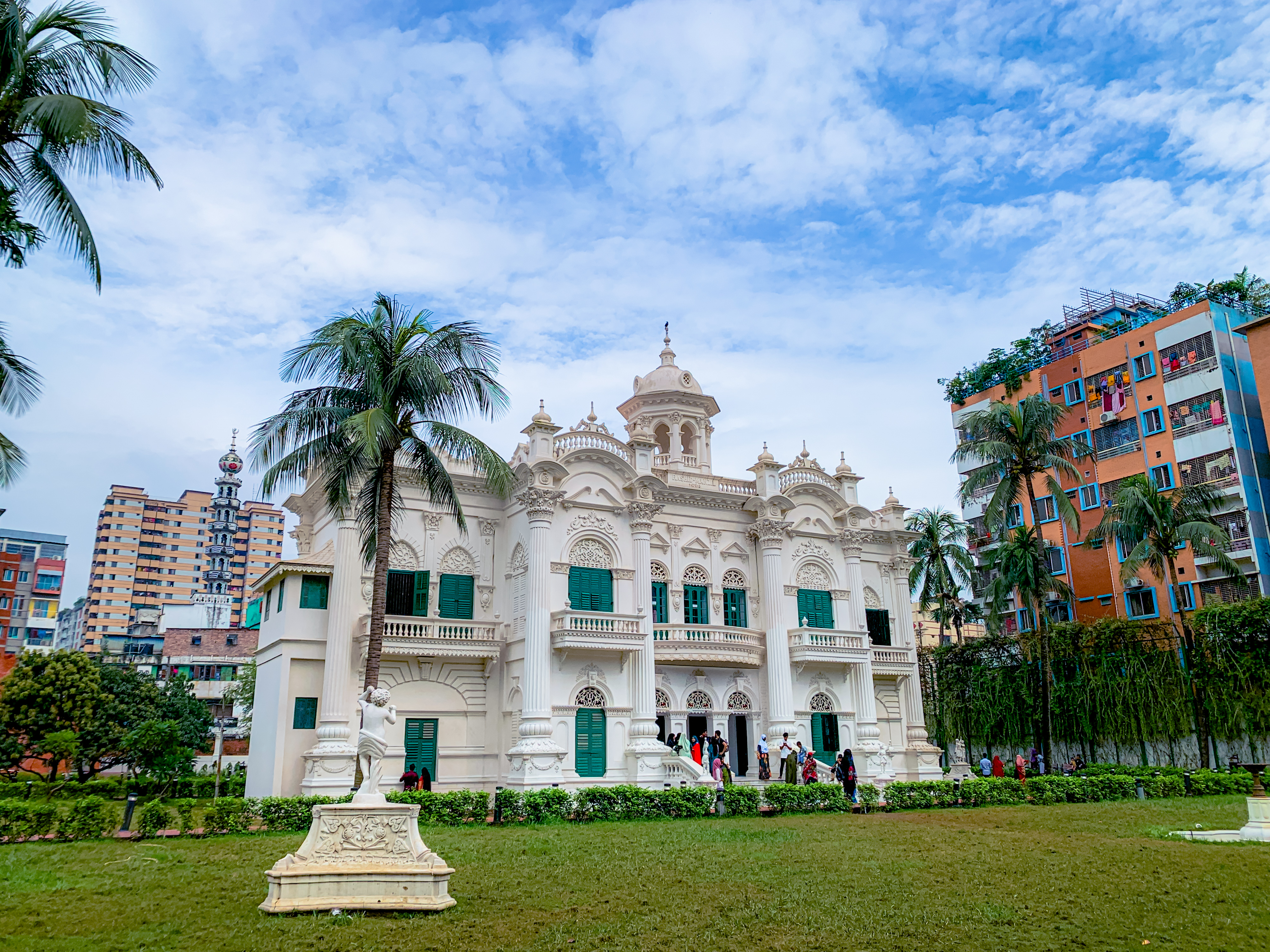
- Interactive map of the Rose Garden Palace area

General information
- Location: Dhaka, Bangladesh
- Coordinates: 23°43′5″N 90°25′35″E

The Rose Garden Palace is a mansion and garden in Old Dhaka, Bangladesh. Built in the late 19th century, it became the birthplace of the Awami League on 23 June 1949, when East Bengali liberal and social democrats converged in Dhaka to form an alternative political force against the Muslim League in Pakistan.

The property is situated on K.M. Das Lane in Tikatully area of Old Dhaka, near the modern business district of Motijheel and near the Baldha Garden in Gopibug area of Dhaka. The mansion was built by a Hindu zamidar (landlord) Hrishikesh Das. He lived in the mansion for a decade. In 1927, he became bankrupt and sold the mansion to another zamidar Boshuruddin Sarkar of Nabinagar under Brahmanbaria district. Later the mansion was sold to a businessman by the family of Boshuruddin Sarkar after his death.

The government has revealed plans to turn the location into a museum.

== History ==
The Rose Garden Palace was built by a Hindu zamindar Hrishikesh Das in the late 19th century. Around that time jalsas (parties) held at Baldha Garden were an important part of the social life of the city's wealthier Hindu residents. The story goes that Hrishikesh Das, being insulted on this account by someone at one of the jalsas (parties) at Baldha Garden, and decided to create his own garden to outshine that of Baldha Garden. Here he staged jalsas of his own. The centrepiece of the garden is an elegant pavilion. However, this was not created as a residence, but rather a setting for entertainment such as musical performances (although subsequent owners did use it as a house). This extravagant lifestyle caused Hrishikesh Das to go bankrupt and consequently he was forced to sell the property.

In 1937 the Rose Garden Palace was bought by a prominent businessman Khan Bahadur Kazi Abdur Rashid of Dhaka from the family members of Late Bashiruddin Sarker under Brahmanbaria district. He renamed the building as Rashid Manzil. His son Kazi Raquib inherited and the property has been maintained for years thereafter by his surviving family, with his wife Laila Raquib being the chief caretaker in its maintenance.

The building had been renovated by its previous owners while keeping the original character fully maintained.

The government of Bangladesh bought the building for Tk 331.70 crore in a purchase announced on 9 August 2018. The government has since announced plans to turn the location into a Museum.

== Architecture ==
The lodge contains on the ground floor eight apartments including a 30’-0” + 15’-0” central hall whilst the upper floor has a further five apartments including a large dance hall measuring 45’-0” + 15’-0” in the middle. All the apartments are furnished with elite mosaic, numerous colorful skylights and wall ornaments. Some of them are adorn with foliage and animal outlines in wood, colored Belgium glass and iron. An ostentatious dome is above the dance hall, and the dance circle is surrounded by cascades. The ceiling is floral patterned and embellished with green mirrors. Tall crystal chandeliers hang from the ceiling. An intricately designed spiral staircase before the ballroom leads to the roof. At the back of the building to the east there is a verandah triple-arched entrance porch which leads to a staircase for the upper storey. Originally there was an ornamental fountain in the garden, the structure of which still remains. There are several classical marble statues in the garden, although the rose garden that gave the mansion its name does not exist anymore.

== Photo gallery ==
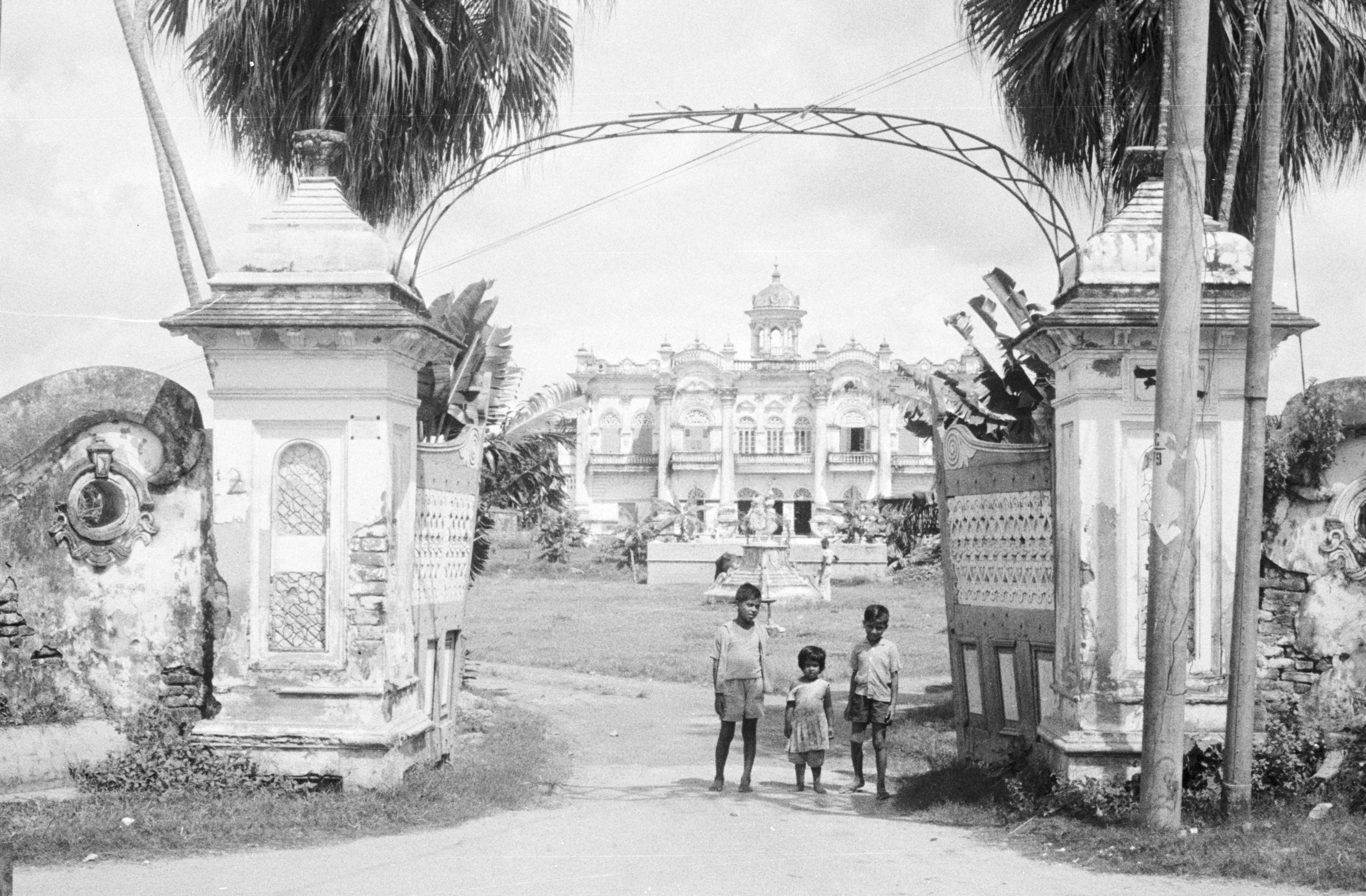
From the entrance, 1967

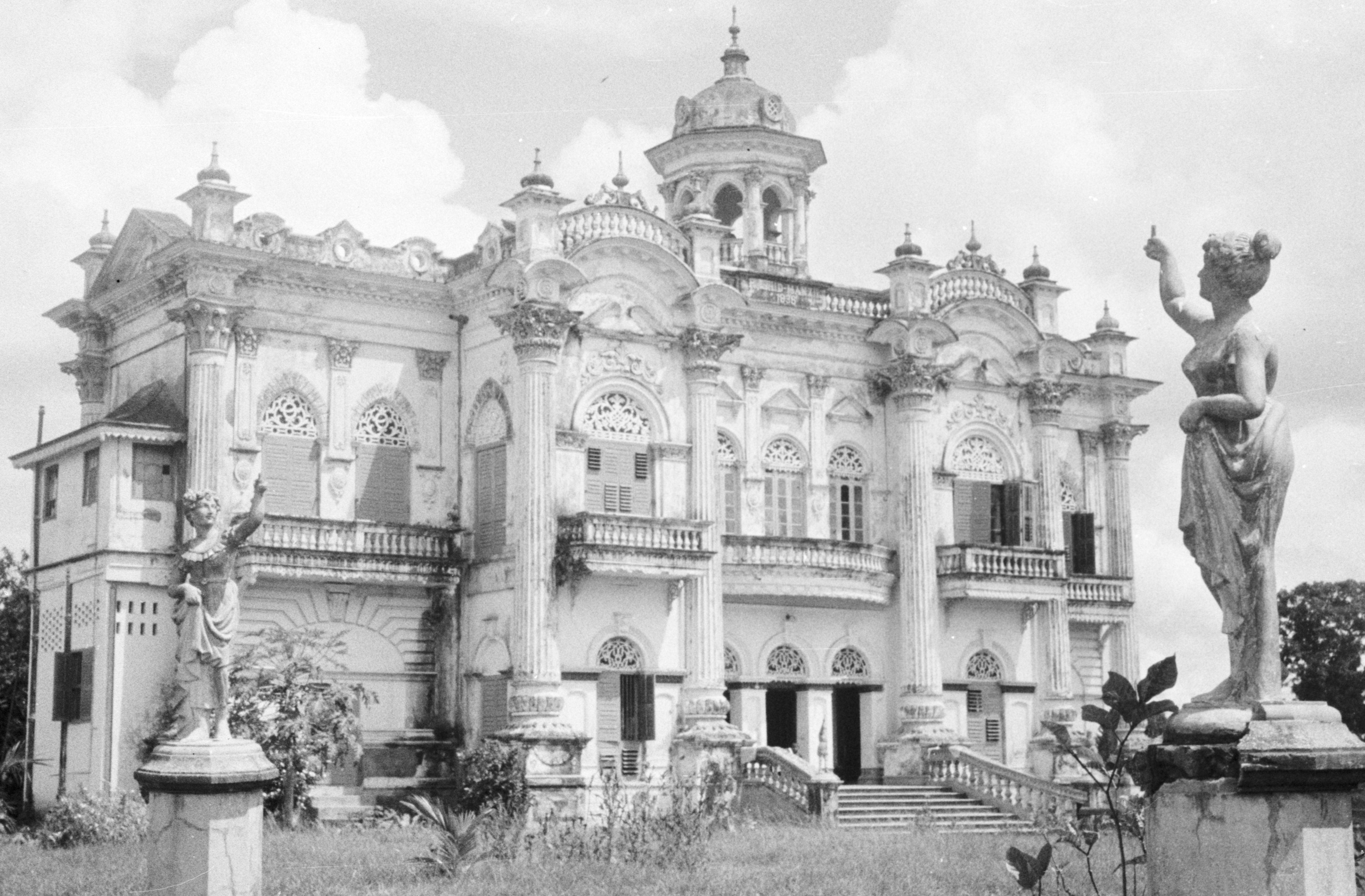
The mansion seen from the garden, 1967

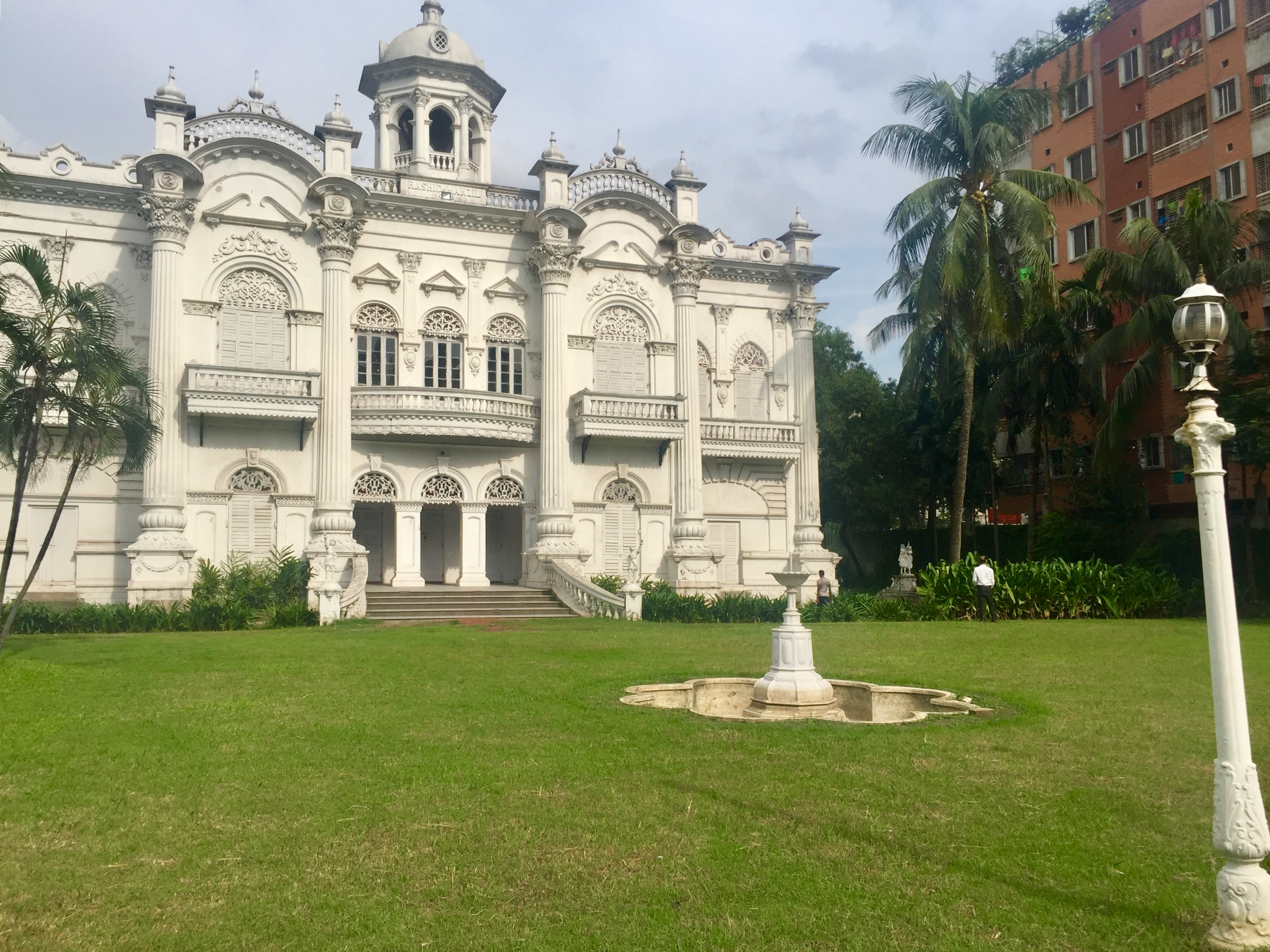

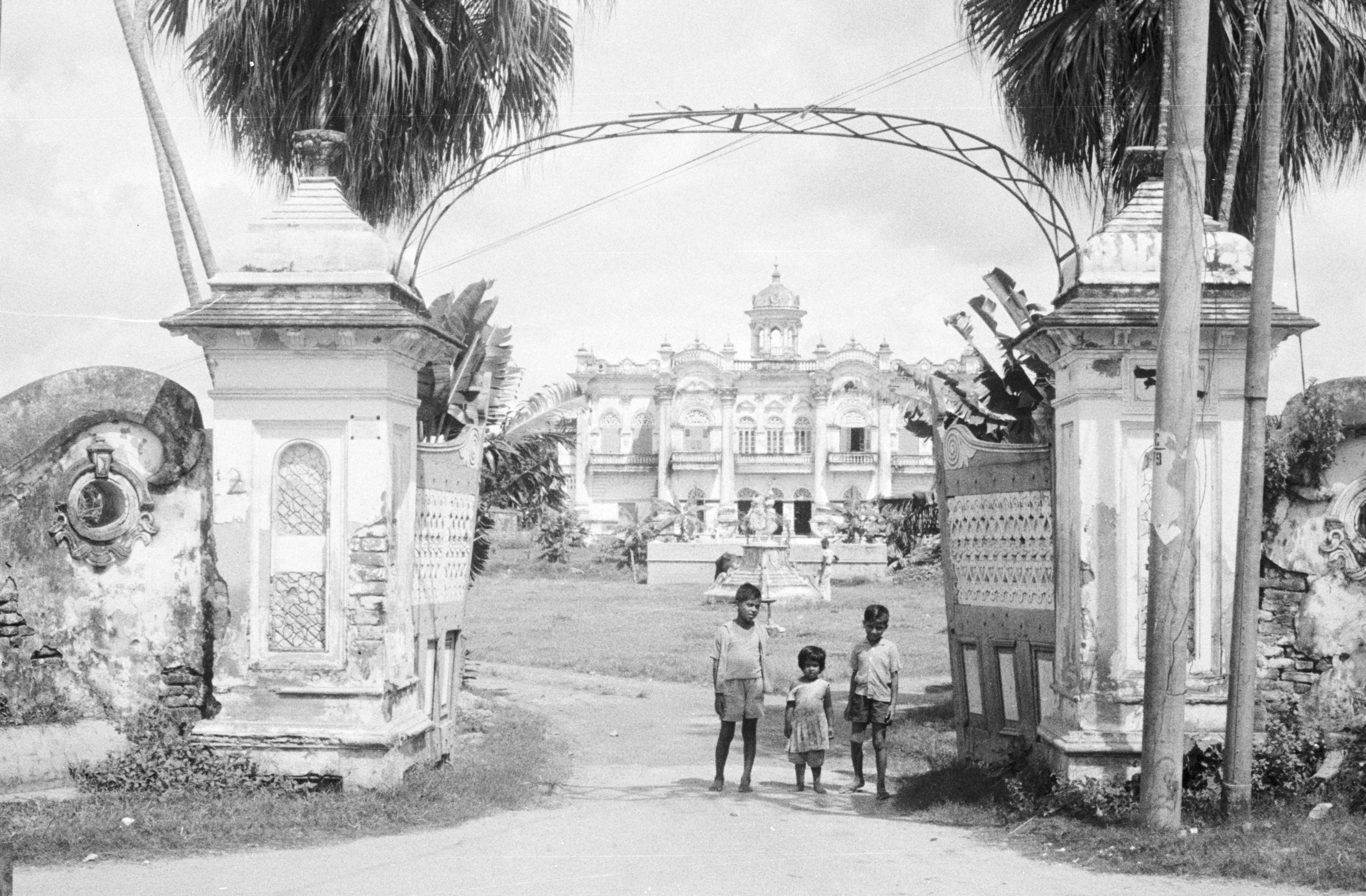
The gateway to the mansion, 1967

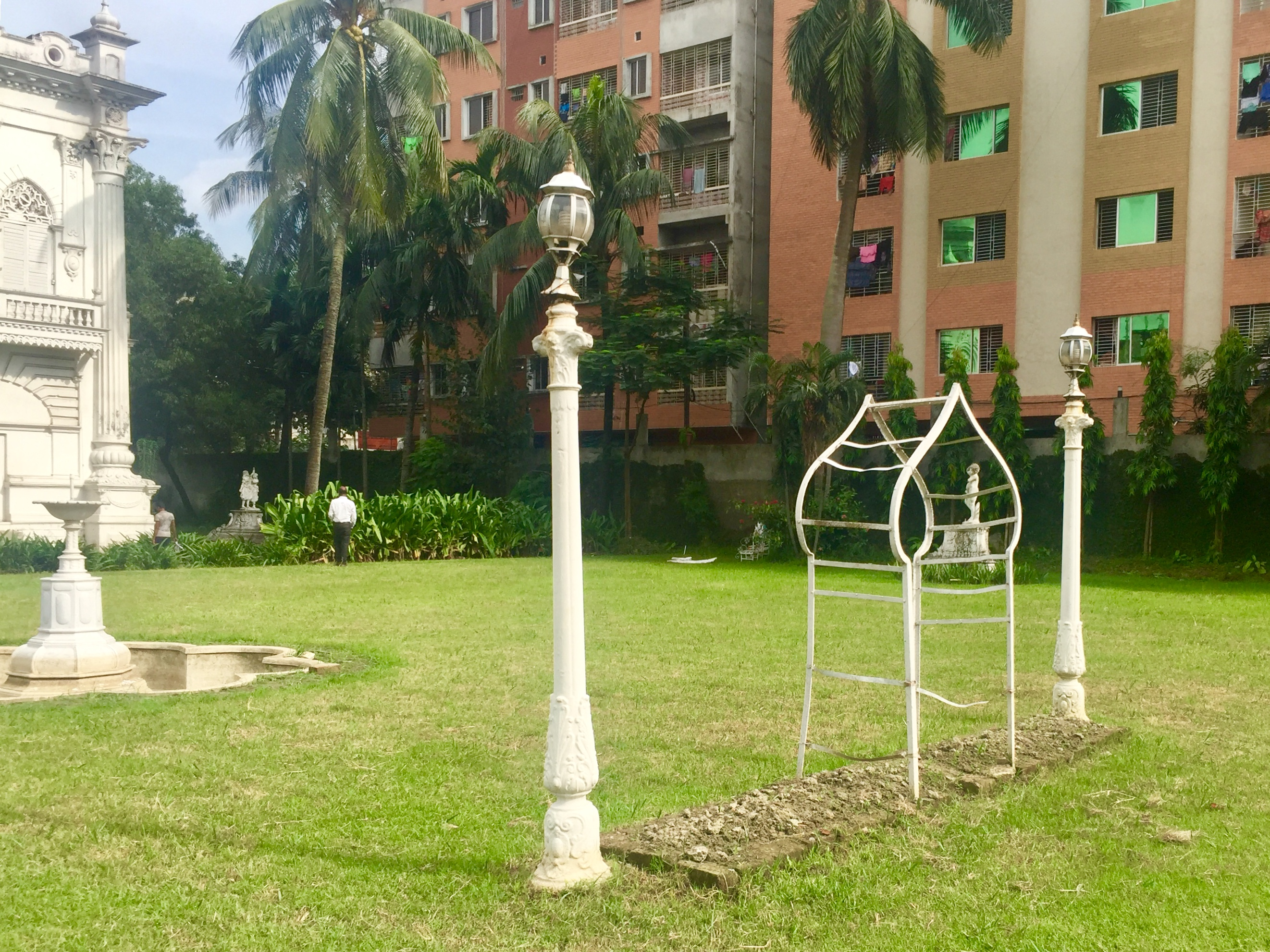

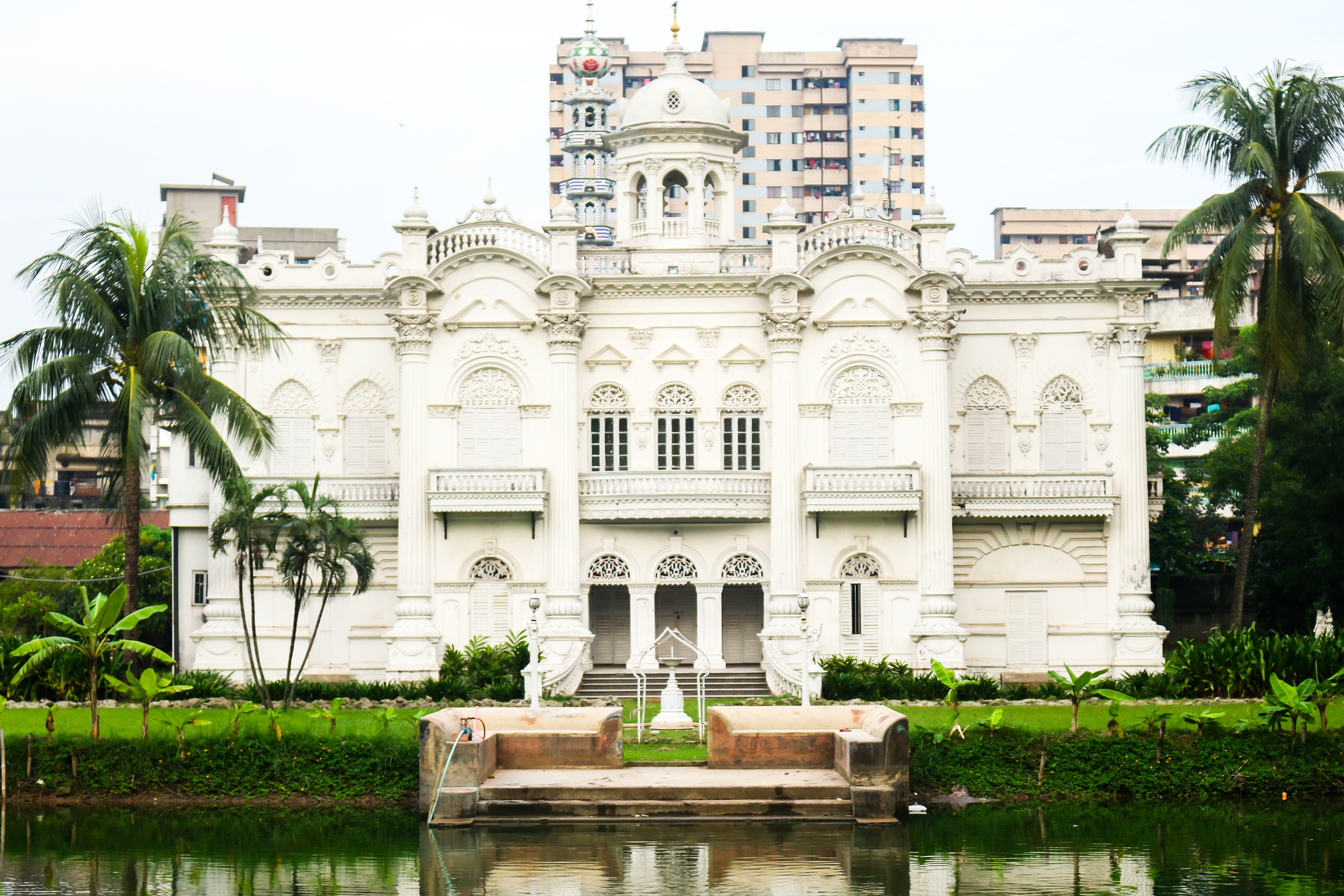

== See also ==
- List of archaeological sites in Bangladesh
