= Khondoker Bazlul Hoque =

Khondoker Bazlul Hoque is a professor of International Business at the University of Dhaka. He is the chairman of the governing body of Tejgaon College. He is the president of Bangladesh Paribesh Andolan. He is the vice-chairman of Innovation, Creativity and Entrepreneurship Center of the University of Dhaka.

Hoque is former member of Bangladesh Public Service Commission. He is the former chairman of Agrani Bank. He is the chairperson of the sub-committee on forest and environment of the Awami League.

== Career ==
Hoque was the president of Federation of the Dhaka University Teachers' Association in 2009. He was appointed chairman of Agrani Bank, state owned bank, by the Awami League which had come to power in January 2009. It had also appointed Qazi Baharul Islam chairman of Sonali Bank and Abul Barakat chairman of Janata Bank, also state owned banks. During his tenure questions papers for recruitment of the bank were leaked.

Hoque was the president of Federation of Bangladesh University Teachers' Association in 2011.

The Anti-Corruption Commission announced plans to interrogate former officials of Agrani Bank including Hoque over 2.7 billion BDT loan scam in the Motijheel branch of the bank.

Hoque was the vice-president of Bangladesh Paribesh Andolan.

In 2022, Hoque was the chairperson of the sub-committee on forest and environment of the Awami League. He was appointed professor emeritus of the University of Dhaka. He was the acting president of Bangladesh Paribesh Andolan.
