= Prince of Wales bakery =

Prince of Wales bakery is a historic Bakery in Dhaka, Bangladesh. It is the oldest continuing bakery in Dhaka.

== History ==
Prince of Wales bakery was established in Dhaka circa 1850 by a man from Wales, Great Britain. The original owner left shortly before the Partition of India. The bakery is located in Lakshmi Bazaar, Old Dhaka. After the original owner left, the bakery and premises was bought by a former employee, Sheikh Buddhu Mia, who continued the baker. The Bakery has been owned by three generations of Sheikh Buddhu Mia's family. The bakery was the first in Dhaka to offer wedding cakes and Christmas cakes. The bakery bakes in a traditional method with equipments that are a hundred years old. It's Christmas cakes are a traditional Christmas item of Old Dhaka. The bakery used to have portraits of the English monarchy. The bakery has declined in recent years and is now a confectionery store.
