= Siddiqur Rahman Choudhury =

Finance secretary of the government of Bangladesh

- Born: 1949 (age 76–77); Sylhet District, East Pakistan
- Occupations: Banker, politician
- Known for: Secretary of finance of Bangladesh in 2006

Siddiqur Rahman Choudhury is a former finance secretary of the government of Bangladesh and former chairperson of the Social Marketing Company. He is the former chairman of Agrani Bank, Sadharan Bima Corporation, and Sonali Bank, UK Ltd. He is the former independent director of MIDAS Financing Limited.

== Early life ==
Choudhury was born in 1949 in Sylhet District, East Pakistan, Pakistan. He completed his bachelor's and master's in chemistry from the University of Dhaka. He also has a diploma in public financial management (PFM) from the University of Connecticut in the United States.

== Career ==
In 1977, Choudhury joined the Bangladesh Civil Service in the audit and accounts cadre.

Choudhury was the secretary of the Finance Division of the Ministry of Finance in 2006 under M Saifur Rahman, minister of finance. That year he became the secretary of finance. In July 2006, he told the media that it will take some time to verify things before the funds requested by the Election Commission Secretariat were released.

In 2007, as chairman of Agrani Bank, Choudhury took steps to turn the bank into a public limited company.

On 19 March 2014, Choudhury became an independent director of MIDAS Financing Limited. He is an independent director of National Housing Finance and Investments Limited. He served as team leader of SPFMSP Project of the Maxwell Stamp. He participated in a memorial event held in honor of former finance minister M Saifur Rahman on 5 September 2015.

Choudhury became the chairman of Social Marketing Company in September 2017 for a two-year term. Choudhury was reelected chairman of Social Marketing Company on 7 September 2019.
