= Zaid Bakht =

Bangladesh economist, researcher and former chairperson

Zaid Bakht is a Bangladesh economist, researcher, and former chairperson of Agrani Bank Limited, the second largest nationalized bank in Bangladesh. He worked as a research at Bangladesh Institute of Development Studies.

== Early life ==
Bakht was born in 1949 in Sylhet District, East Pakistan, Pakistan. He completed his undergraduate in economics from the University of Dhaka. He completed his Masters and PhD in economics from Cornell University.

== Career ==
Bakht joined Bangladesh Institute of Development Studies in 1971 as an economist.

Bakht was a member of the National Committee on the Formulation of Industrial Policy in 1982.

In 2002, Bakht served as a member of the Public Expenditure Review Commission.

Bkaht worked as an economist on the development of the Sixth Five Year Plan of the Government of Bangladesh.

In 2012, Bakht evaluated the Equity Entrepreneurship Fund for Bangladesh Bank. He visited Colombo, Sri Lanka, to attend the 12th annual conference of South Asia Network of Economic Research Institute. Bakht had served as a Director of Sonali Bank Limited in 2012. He had also served as a member of the syndicate board of Shahjalal University of Science and Technology.

Bakht worked at the Bangladesh Institute of Development Studies till 2014 when he retired from it as a research director and head of research. He has worked as a visiting faculty at East West University and North South University. He was appointed Chairman of Agrani Bank, a state owned bank, in 2015 by the Government of Bangladesh.

On 7 December 2020, Bakht was reappointed, third time in a row, chairman of Agrani Bank by the Financial Institutions Division for three years. He was also the chairperson of Agrani Exchange House Private Limited. He was the chairman of Agrani Remittance House Sdn Bhd.
