= A. H. M. Habibur Rahman =

Bangladeshi academic

A. H. M. Habibur Rahman is a Bangladeshi academic and former chairman of Sonali Bank, the largest bank in Bangladesh. He was a professor and the dean of the school of business at Primeasia University.

== Early life ==
Rahman did his bachelor's and master's degrees in commerce at the University of Dhaka. He completed his PhD at Durham University. He completed a postgraduate diploma at the Brunel University of London.

== Career ==
From 1981 to 1987, Rahman was the dean of the faculty of business studies at the University of Dhaka. From 1999 to 2000, Rahman was the chairman of the Board of Directors of Bangladesh Shilpa Rin Shangstha.

Rahman was appointed chairman of Sonali Bank in December 2012 replacing Quazi Baharul Islam. He was the dean of the school of business at Primeasia University. The Bank profits plunged 70 percent in 2014. In April 2015, Rahman resigned as chairman of the Sonali Bank in a letter to the managing director of the bank, Pradip Kumar Dutta. He is an independent director of Pride Group. He has served as a director of Paramount Holdings Limited, Paramount Green Garments Limited, and H.R.Textile Mills Limited.

Rahman established the Prof. Dr. A H M Habibur Rahman Trust Fund at the University of Dhaka to establish a merit-based scholarship for students of the department of Finance at the University of Dhaka. He is a founding executive member of The University of Comilla, UNIC.

== Bibliography ==
- Entrepreneurship and Small Enterprise Development in Bangladesh (1979)
