= Agrani Bank =

Bangladeshi Bank

Agrani Bank PLC.
- Type: Public
- Industry: Banking, Financial services
- Predecessors: Habib Bank Limited; Commerce Bank
- Founded: 26 March 1972
- Headquarters: Dhaka, Bangladesh
- Number of locations: 979 (2025)
- Area served: Bangladesh
- Key people: Syed Abu Naser Bukhtear Ahmed (Chairman); Md. Anwarul Islam (CEO)
- Products: Finance and insurance Consumer Banking; Corporate Banking; Investment Banking; Investment Management
- Operating income: ▼US$86.4 million (2020)
- Total assets: ▲US$14.6 billion (2025)
- Number of employees: 11,389 (2020)
- Website: www.agranibank.org

Agrani Bank PLC. (Bengali: অগ্রণী ব্যাংক) is a state-owned commercial bank of Bangladesh established in 1972. Its headquarters is situated at Motijheel in Dhaka, the capital city of Bangladesh. Md. Anwarul Islam is the CEO of Agrani Bank.

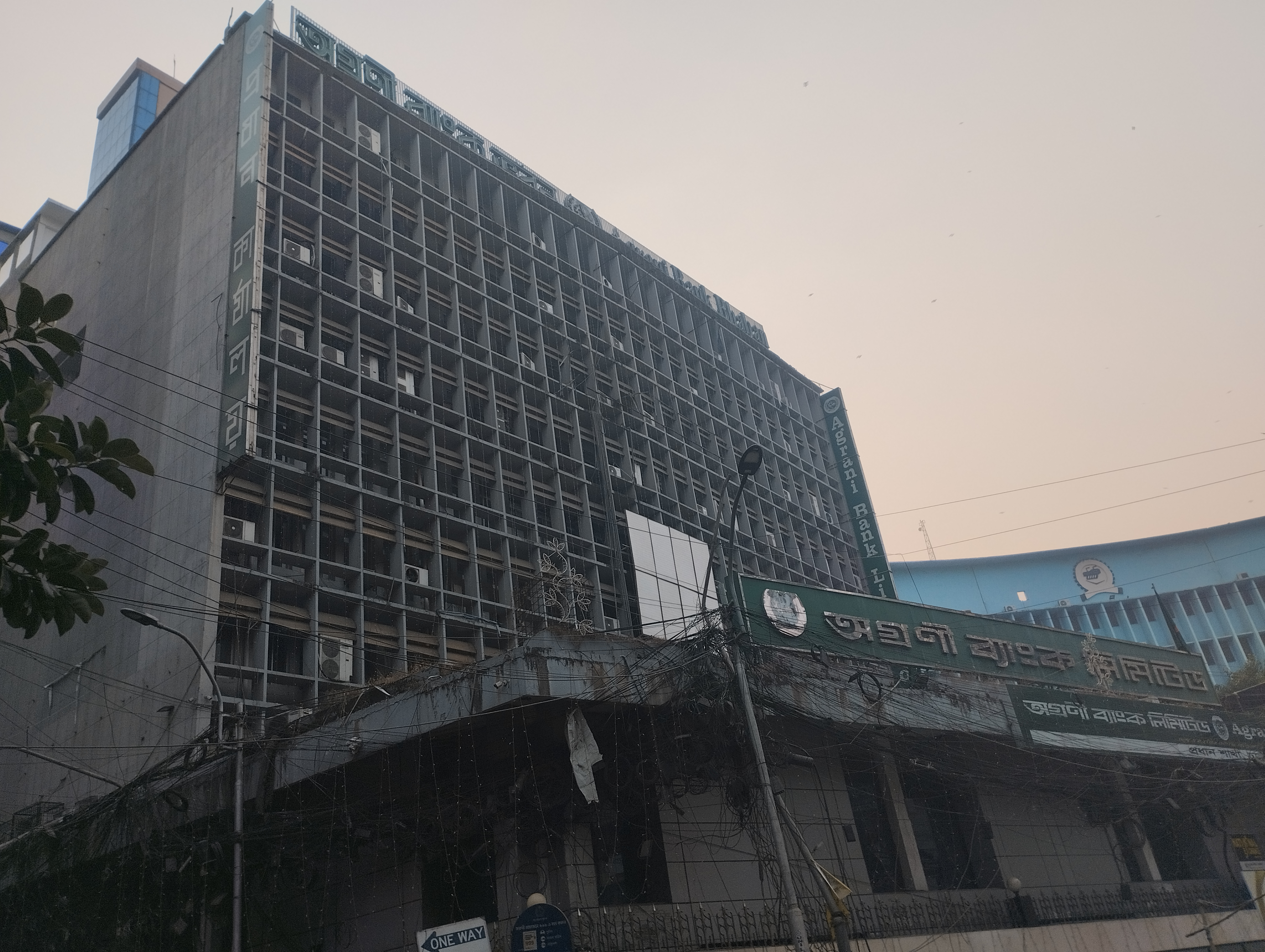
Head Office of Agrani Bank

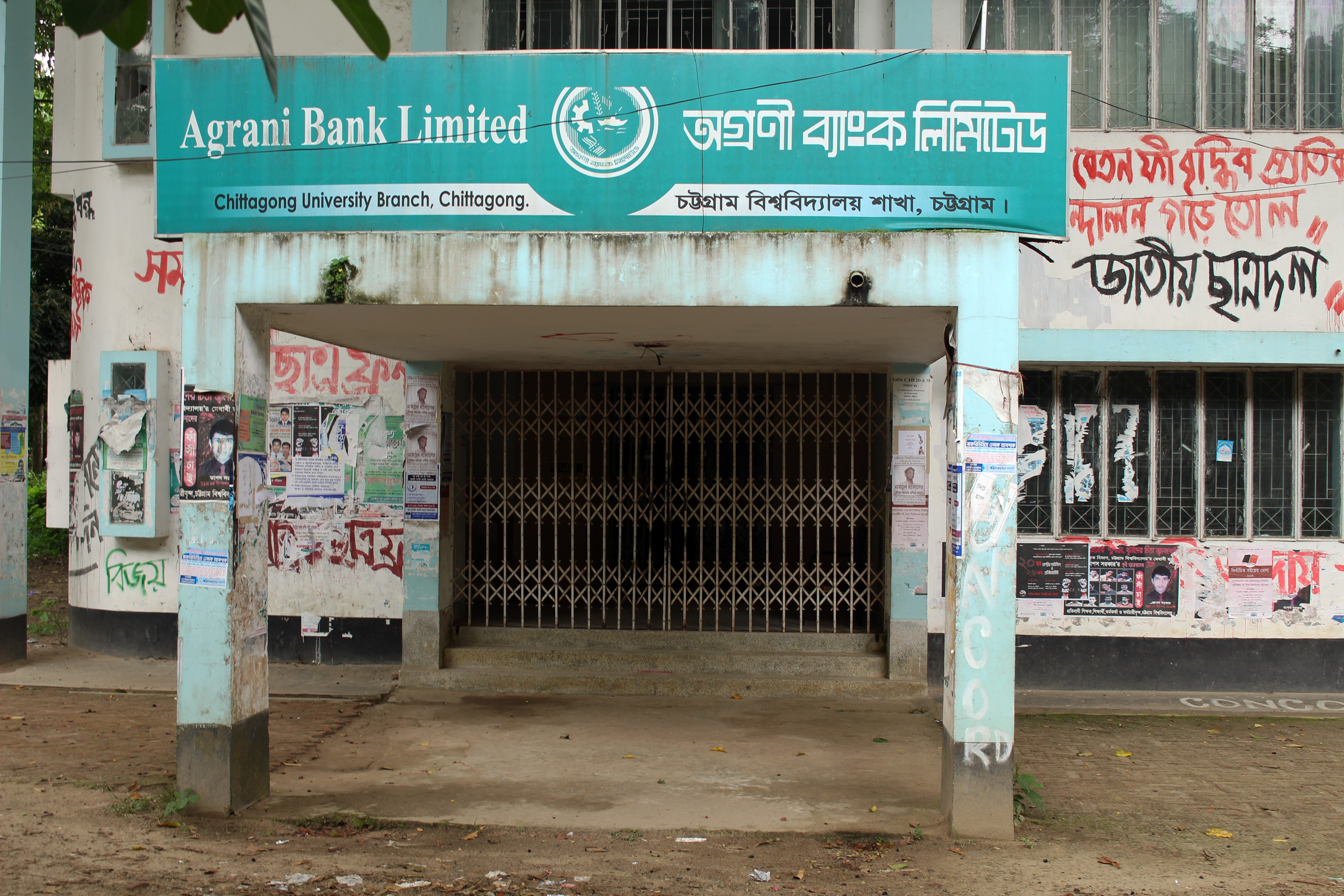
Chittagong University Branch, Hathazari

== History ==
Agrani Bank Limited was established on 26 March 1972 by combining two abandoned Pakistani banks, Commerce Bank and Habib Bank. The bank is fully owned by the Government of Bangladesh. M. Fazlur Rahman was the first managing director of the bank. Agrani Bank is governed by a board of directors consisting of 12 members headed by a chairman.

In 1995, Agrani Bank installed the first automated teller machine in Bangladesh at the Jatiya Press Club.

In 2006, Purbo Banglar Communist Party, demanded toll from six branches of Agrani Bank. In 2007, Agrani Bank, led by chairperson Siddiqur Rahman Choudhury, along with two other state-owned banks, Sonali Bank Limited and Janata Bank Limited, were made into public limited companies.

As of 2009, the bank has 11 Circle offices, 34 Divisions in head office, 62 zonal offices and 941 branches including 27 corporate and 40 AD (authorized dealer) branches. Agrani Bank also has remittance houses in Singapore, Malaysia and Canada. It was corporatized on 15 November 2007 and emerged as Agrani Bank Limited (ABL) taking over the assets, liability and goodwill of Agrani Bank. The authorized capital of the bank was Tk 8 billion. It is also the owner of the Agrani Bank Ltd football club and Agrani Bank Cricket Club.

Khandaker Bazlul Haque, president of Dhaka University Teachers' Association, was appointed chairman of Agrani Bank in September 2009. Syed Abdul Hamid was appointed managing director of the bank in July 2010.

An audit in 2013 by Office of Comptroller and Auditor General found that Agrani Bank had 28.85 billion taka in losses due to improper lending.

In November 2014, Zaid Bakht, research director of Bangladesh Institute of Development Studies, was appointed chairman.

In 2015, Agrani Bank re-appointed Syed Abdul Hamid managing director; a post he held since 2014. Agrani Bank branch in Jessore District was robbed of 2.1 million armed robbers.

In June 2016, Syed Abdul Hamid, the managing director of Agrani Bank was removed by Bangladesh Bank for providing 7.92 billion taka worth of loans against rules. Deputy Managing Director Mizanur Rahman Khan was arrested by Anti Corruption Commission of Bangladesh. Khan was arrested hours after the Ministry of Finance appointed him acting managing director of the bank along with two other officials.

Following these removals, Mohammad Shams-Ul Islam was appointed the new managing director in August 2016. Upon his appointment, Islam immediately set in place a 100 Day Roadmap to recalibrate bank objectives, emphasizing growth and innovation in product offerings. By December 2016, the bank reported a 300% growth in operating profit, to Tk. 5.5 billion. The parliamentary standing committee on Estimate formed an investigation committee led by Yusuf Abdullah Harun to look into the loans following a report by Bangladesh Bank which found widespread irregularities at the bank. The other two members of the investigation committee were Sheikh Fazle Noor Taposh and Waseqa Ayesha Khan. Bangladesh Securities and Exchange Commission approved Agrani Banks request to form a billion taka mutual fund.

Anti Corruption Commission of Bangladesh filled charges against Mizanur Rahman Shaheen and his brother, Mujibur Rahman Milon, for embezzling more than 1.4 billion taka from the bank in March 2018. They are believed to have fled Bangladesh for Canada and Singapore. Former manager of the bank, Nibaran Chandra Tanchangya, was arrested for embezzling money from the Bandarban District branch. It has a branch in Canada which is loss making concern for the bank.

In December 2020, Zaid Bakht was re-appointed chairman of Agrani Bank for a third time in a row. In November 2021, Agrani Bank was identified as a weak bank due to 24.63 billion taka shortfall. Haji Selim, member of parliament from Awami League, had grabbed land belonging to Agrani Bank in Moulvibazar, Old Dhaka which he had claimed since 2003. The bank was able to recover the land in 2020 but the building was demolished by Haji Selim. Bangladesh Bank had discovered an irregular loan by Agrani Bank for 350 million taka to Stylecraft Limited. Bangladesh Bank also fined Agrani Bank for proving loan to a known defaulter, Swiss Quality Paper, subsidiary of the Tanaka Group, with "undue privilege".

Agrani Bank was the lone supplier of foreign exchange to the Padma Bridge construction project and had paid more than 1.2 billion USD to suppliers and contractors. Anti-Corruption Commission began an investigation against the managing director of the bank, Mohammad Shams-Ul Islam, in February 2022. In August 2022, Md Murshedul Kabir, was appointed Managing Director of Agrani Bank replacing Mohammad Shams-Ul Islam. SWIFT asked Agrani Bank to suspend all transaction with Russia following the Russian invasion of Ukraine. Bangladesh Bank fined Agrani bank for failure to recover loan from Dolly Construction Limited. Previously, a 2020 investigation by Bangladesh Bank revealed that Agrani bank had failed to report the loan account of Dolly Construction to the central bank's Credit Information Bureau (CIB) database.

== Board of directors ==
Name	Designation	Reference
Syed Abu Naser Bukhtear Ahmed	Chairman	
Khondker Fazle Rashid	Director	
Mohammad Masud Rana Chowdhury	Director	
DR. Md. Fazlul Hoque	Director	
Kabirul Ezdani Khan	Director	
Mohammad Sultan Mahmud	Director	
Md. Anwarul Islam	Chief Executive Officer	

== See also ==
- List of banks
- List of banks in Bangladesh
