= Dholaikhal =

Historic neighbourhood in Old Dhaka

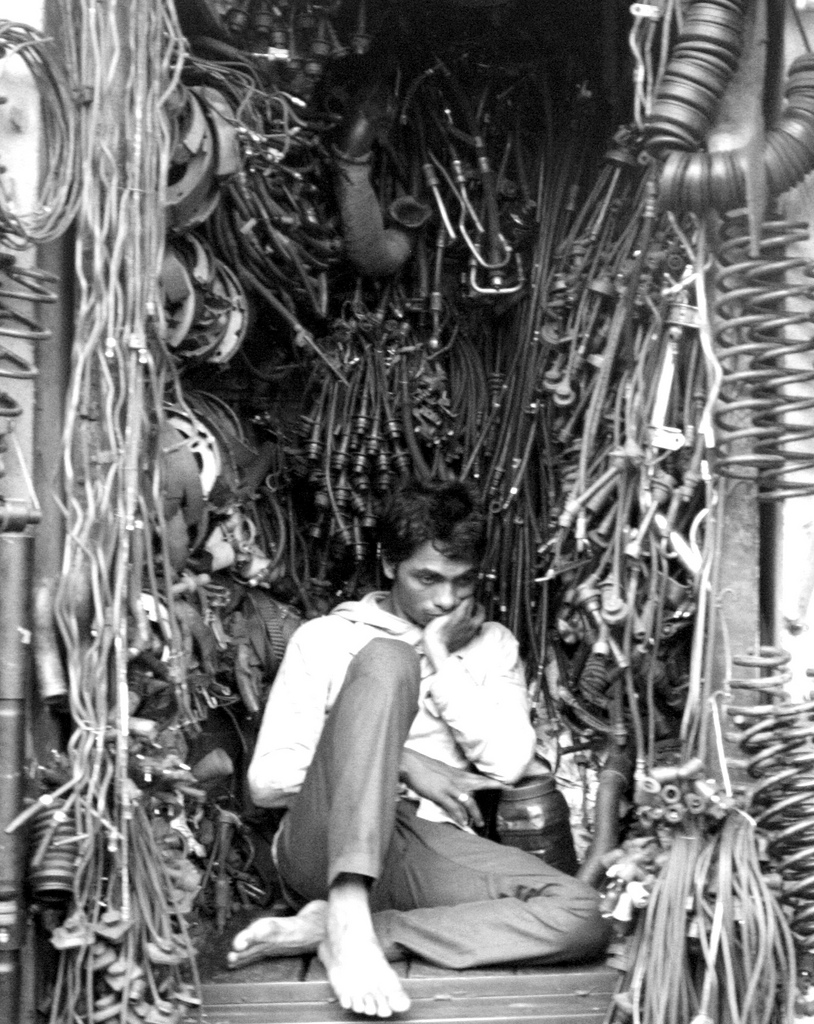
A Shopkeeper in DholaiKhal, Dhaka

Dholaikhal is a historic neighborhood in Old Dhaka. It is 550 sq yards and borders Bahadur Shah Park and Tipu Sultan road.

== History ==
Dholaikhal is named after an early 15th century canal built by Islam Khan I, the Mughal Subahdar of Bengal and who moved the capital of Bengal to Dhaka. The canal was for both defense and navigation. There was a bridge over the canal connecting Gendaria the outscart of Dhaka city to the mainland of Dhaka. Over time trash was dumped in the canal, clogging it, and the canal was made into an underground sewage line in some parts. And other part developed into a beautiful lake,

History of the lake "GhorarJheel"

Bangladesh, "C&B" historically referred to the Construction and Building Department, a key government agency responsible for public works and infrastructure development during the British colonial period and later, after the partition of 1947. At the eastern end of the then Dhaka city, i.e. at the Dholaikhal Nararinda intersection, there was a huge structure surrounded by a wall on the east side, which was originally a sluice gate building of the culverted Dholaikhal operated by C&B. After that sluice gate, the remnants of Dholaikhal were flowing, which was still flowing from Jurain, Mirhajirbagh, Dayaganj, Murgitola, Katherpul and Loharpul to Buriganga. Due to the encroachment of the canal, the ratio of clean water of the canal gradually decreased over time. In addition, after a large part of the northern side of the canal was culverted and turned into a paved road, the entire canal turned into a huge 100% flowing sewer. There was a huge reservoir behind the sluice gate building operated by C&B, which the locals called "Sempirgara" regionally and there were a lot of crows in the sewer.The densely populated area on the banks of the canal was named "Kowartak". The remaining flowing part of the canal after the reservoir was called "Sempikhal" by the locals. In 2004, the flowing part of the canal was converted into a road up to "Jaulangar" i.e. Sutrapur Bazar. The "Katherpool" and "Loharpool" were demolished. At that time, the huge C&B facility practically became useless and remained abandoned for a long time in the middle of that huge reservoir next to "Bainagar" road. After that, it was demolished. After that, the reservoir, or "Sempikhal" in the locals' language, with the memory of the Dholaikhal canal, continued to pollute the environment for a long time, at one time turning into a mosquito breeding hatchery! Ultimately, the Dhaka South City Corporation (DSCC) took the initiative to upgrade this reservoir into a stormwater reservoir lake and also develop it into a walkway, park and recreation center. After a long period of maintenance and development, the beauty of some parts of the lake is now visible. traditionally this place was the easternmost border of Dhaka, the British Company's Companyganj (later named Begumganj after the publication of the Begum newspaper). There were many horse stables in this area since the Mughals, which were called "Argara" in the local language. Many domestic cart horses are still tied around this lake, many local residents and as a landmark call this place as "Ghorar Jheel" of Dholaikhal, since there is a "Hatir Jheel" in Dhaka whose history is associated with elephants, and the history of "GhorarJheel" is associated with horses from the very beginning

Dholaikhal is a commercial area with many shops, mostly specializing in car parts, and metal workshops.
