= Urban East Bengali =

Dialect of Bengali

Urban East Bengal Colloquial
- পূর্ববঙ্গীয় শহুরে বাংলা
- Native to: Bangladesh
- Ethnicity: Bengalis of East Bengal (present-day Bangladesh)
- Language family: Indo-European: Indo Iranian; Indo Aryan; Eastern Zone; Bengali-Assamese; Bengali; Urban East Bengal Colloquial
- Early forms: Gaudi Prakrit: Old Bengali; Middle Bengali
- Writing system: Bengali alphabet

Language codes
- ISO 639-3: –

Urban East Bengali or Urban East Bengal Colloquial is a variety of Bengali language, spoken in the urban areas of present-day Bangladesh by educated East Bengalis. The dialect is based on regional Eastern Bengali dialects, with considerable influence from Western Bengali dialect. It is considered as a Semi-standard and prestige dialect within the nation.

This dialect is based on, or formed by a mixture of, the regional dialects of Eastern Bengal. Grammatically, it has been described as similar to the Eastern Bengali group of dialects, especially the Dhaka-Mymensingh dialect. However, it also shows influence from Standard Colloquial Bengali, while remaining distinct from both dialects.

== Phonology ==
Urban East Bengali is characterised by similar phoneme inventory like Standard Bengali.

=== Epenthesis ===
Urban East Bengali notably preserves the Middle Bengali tendency of a form of "epenthesis" (Bengali: অপিনিহিতি, romanized: ôpinihiti) of high-vowel glides (i.e. /i̯/ and /u̯/) across a non-initial consonant boundary like Typical Eastern Bengali dialects.

Variants of Perfective Participle in Bengali Dialects
Verbal Noun	Standard literary Bengali +[ia]	West Bengal Colloquial +[-e]	East Bengal Colloquial+[iØa]
করা [kɔra] (to do)	করিয়া [kɔria]	করে [kɔre]	কইরা [kɔira]
চলা [tʃɔla] (to walk)	চলিয়া [tʃɔlia]	চলে [tʃɔle]	চইলা [tʃɔila]
দেওয়া [deoya] (to give)	দিয়া [dia]	দিয়ে [die]	দিয়া [dia]
থাকা [tʰaka] (to stay)	থাকিয়া [tʰakia]	থেকে [tʰeke]	থাইকা [tʰaika]
বসা [bɔsa] (to sit)	বসিয়া [bɔsia]	বসে [bɔse]	বইসা [bɔisa]
মারা [mara] (to kill)	মারিয়া [maria]	মেরে [mere]	মাইরা [maira]
হওয়া [hɔoya] (to be)	হইয়া [hɔia]	হয়ে [hɔe]	হইয়া [hɔia]

== Morphology ==
Examples of adding different word suffixes to words in different cases are given below:

Case-Category	Suffix	Example
Nominative	0 (zero suffix)	Bengali: মীনা ভূতের গল্প লিখতেছিল। (Mina bhooter golpo likhtechilo). English: Mina was writing ghost stories. Bengali: ছাত্ররা পরীক্ষা দিবে না। (chatrora porikkha dibe na). English: The students will not appear in the exam.
Accusative	ke [কে], re [রে]	Bangla: মামাকে / মামারে যাইতে মানা করেন। (mamake / mamare jaite mana koren). English: Forbid uncle to go.
Instrumental	diya [দিয়া], dara [দ্বারা]	Bengali: বাচ্চারা বল দিয়া খেলতেছে। (bacchara bol diya khelteche). English: The kids are playing with a ball.
Genitive	r [র], er [এর]	Bengali: এইটা আমার বই। অসীমের কলম। (eita amar boi. Asimer kolom). English: This is my book. / Asim's pen.
Ablative	theke [থেকে], hoite [হইতে], chaite/cheye [চাইতে/চেয়ে]	theke: গাছ থেকে পাতা পড়ে। (gach theke pata pore). - Leaves fall from the tree. hoite: বিপদ হইতে বাঁচো। (bipod hoite bacho.) - Save yourself from danger. chaite/cheye: রহিমের চাইতে/ চেয়ে করিম লম্বা। (rohim er chaite/cheye korim lomba). - Karim is taller than Rahim.
Locative	e [এ], y [য়], te [তে], ete [এতে]	e: সে ঘরে আছে। (se ghore ache) - He is in the room. y: ওরে সোজা বাংলায় বলতে বলেন। (Ore soja Banglay bolte bolen) - Ask him to speak simple Bengali. te: এই নদীতে কুমীর আছে। (Ei nodite kumir ache) - There are crocodiles in the river.

Conjugation of verb for পাওয়া [paoya] (to get), stem পা [pa].

Person	Simple Present Present বর্তমান get	Simple Future Future ভবিষ্যৎ shall/will get	Simple Past Past অতীত got	Continuous Present am/are/is getting	Continuous Past was/were getting	Perfect Present have/has got	Perfect Past did get/had got	Imperative অনুজ্ঞা eat!/should get	Future Imperative will/shall get!	Habitual / Conditional নিত্যবৃত্ত / নিত্যবৃত্ত.নিবন্ধ used to / would get
আমি [ami] (I)	পাই [pai]	পাবো [pabɔ]	পাইলাম [pailam]	পাইতেছি [paitecʰi]	পাইতেছিলাম [paitecʰilam]	পাইছি [paicʰi]	পাইলাম [pailam]	পাই [pai]	পাবো [pabɔ]	পাইতাম [paitam]
তুমি [tumi] (You)	পাও [pao]	পাইবা [paiba]	পাইলা [paila]	পাইতেছো [paitecʰo]	পাইতেছিলা [paitecʰile]	পাইছ' [paicʰo]	পাইছিলা [paicʰila]	পাও [pao]	পাইও [paio]	পাইতা [paita]
সে [ʃe] (He/She)	পায় [pay]	পাবে [pabe]	পাইলো [pailo]	পাইতেছে [paitecʰe]	পাইতেছিলো [paitecʰilo]	পাইছে [paicʰe]	পাইছিলো [paicʰilo]	পাউক [pauk]	পাইবে [paibe]	পাইতো [paito]
তিনি/আপনি [tini/apni] (He~She/You)	পান [pan]	পাবেন [paben]	পাইলেন [pailen]	পাইতেছেন [paitecʰen]	পাইতেছিলেন [paitecʰilen]	পাইছেন [paicʰen]	পাইছিলেন [paicʰilen]	পান [pan]	পাইবেন [paiben]	পাইতেন [paiten]
তুই [tui] (You)	পাস [paʃ]	পাবি [pabi]	পাইলি [paili]	পাইতেছিস [paitecʰis]	পাইতেছিলি [paitecʰili]	পাইছিস [paicʰis]	পাইছিলি [paicʰili]	পা [pa]	পাস [pas]	পাইতি [paiti]

== Sample text ==
This text, namely "Story of a Charwoman", an example of Urban East Bengal Colloquial dialect.

Urban East Bengali (Bengali script)	Urban East Bengali (Roman transliteration)	English Translation
একজন ঠিকা কাজের মেয়েলোকের কথা।	Ekjon thika kajer meyeloker kotha.	Story of a Charwoman
আমার নাম রহিমা। আমার বাড়ি ময়মনসিংহ। গ্রামে আমাদের বাড়ি আছে, কিন্তু কিছু জমিজমা কিছু আর নাই।	Amar nam Rohima. Amar bari Moymonsingho. Grame amader bari ache, kintu kichu jomijoma kichu ar nai.	My name is Rahima. My home is in a village in Mymensingh. We have our own house there in the village, but no cultivating field is left for us.
আমার স্বামী রিকশা চালায়। তার নিজের রিকশা নাই, ভাড়ার রিকশা চালায়। তবে যা রোজগার করে, তাতে সংসার চলে না। সেই জন্য আমি বাসায় বাসায় ঠিকা কাজ করি।	Amar shami riksha chalay. Tar nijer riksha nai, bharar riksha chalay. Tobe ja rojgar kore, tate shongshar chole na. Shei jonno ami bashay bashay thika kaj kori.	My husband drives a rickshaw. He has no rickshaw of his own. He drives a hired rickshaw. But his income is not sufficient for the whole family. Therefore, I work for a few houses on a part-time basis.
আমরা ভাড়া করা ঘরে থাকতেছি। ঘরটা একটা ছাপড়া; পানির ব্যবস্থা নাই, ইলেকট্রিক কারেন্টও নাই।	Amra bhara kora ghore thaktechi. Ghorta ekta chapra; panir bæbostha nai, ilektrik karento-o nai.	We live in a rented house. The house is a hut; there is neither a water supply nor electricity.
এই বস্তির বাসাগুলিতে কোন আলাদা পায়খানা নাই। রান্নাঘর বলতেও কিছু নাই।	Ei bostir bashagulite kono alada paykhana nai. Rannaghor bolteo kichu nai.	In these huts of the slum, there is no separate latrine. There exists nothing as a kitchen.
তবে আমি যেই সব বাসায় কাজ করি, তারা অনেক সময় বাসি খাবার থাকলে দিয়া দেয়। সেগুলি আগে আমাদের পোলাপানদেরকে খাইতে দেই। তারপরে পোলাপানের বাপে খায়, আমি খাই।	Tobe ami jei shob bashay kaj kori, tara onek shomoy bashi khabar thakle diya dey. Sheguli age amader polapanderke khaite dei. Tarpore polapaner bape khay, ami khai.	The families for whom I work, give me the food left over from the previous day. We give it first to our children. Then the children's father and I eat.

== Bibliography ==
- Beena, Khaleda (2000). Modern Textbook in Bengali as Foreign Language. Germany:Bengaliska Magasinet; Dhaka: Rabeya Publishers; Göteborg Internationella Kojan.
- Dil, Afia (1986). Diglossia in Bangla: A study of shifts in the verbal repertoire of the educated classes in Dhaka, Bangladesh. Joshua Fishman et al. (eds.), The Fergusonian impact (Vol. 2, Sociolinguistics and the sociology of language). p. 451–465.
- Friedrich, Paul W. (1961). "Linguistic Diversity in South Asia: Studies in Regional, Social and Functional Variation by Charles A. Ferguson and John J. Gumper [review]". Language. 37 (1 (Jan. – Mar., 1961)). Linguistic Society of America: 163–168. JSTOR 411266.
- Shahidullah, Muhammad (1966). Shahidulla Presentation Volume. Pakistan: Linguistic Research Group of Pakistan.
