= Tourism in Bangladesh =

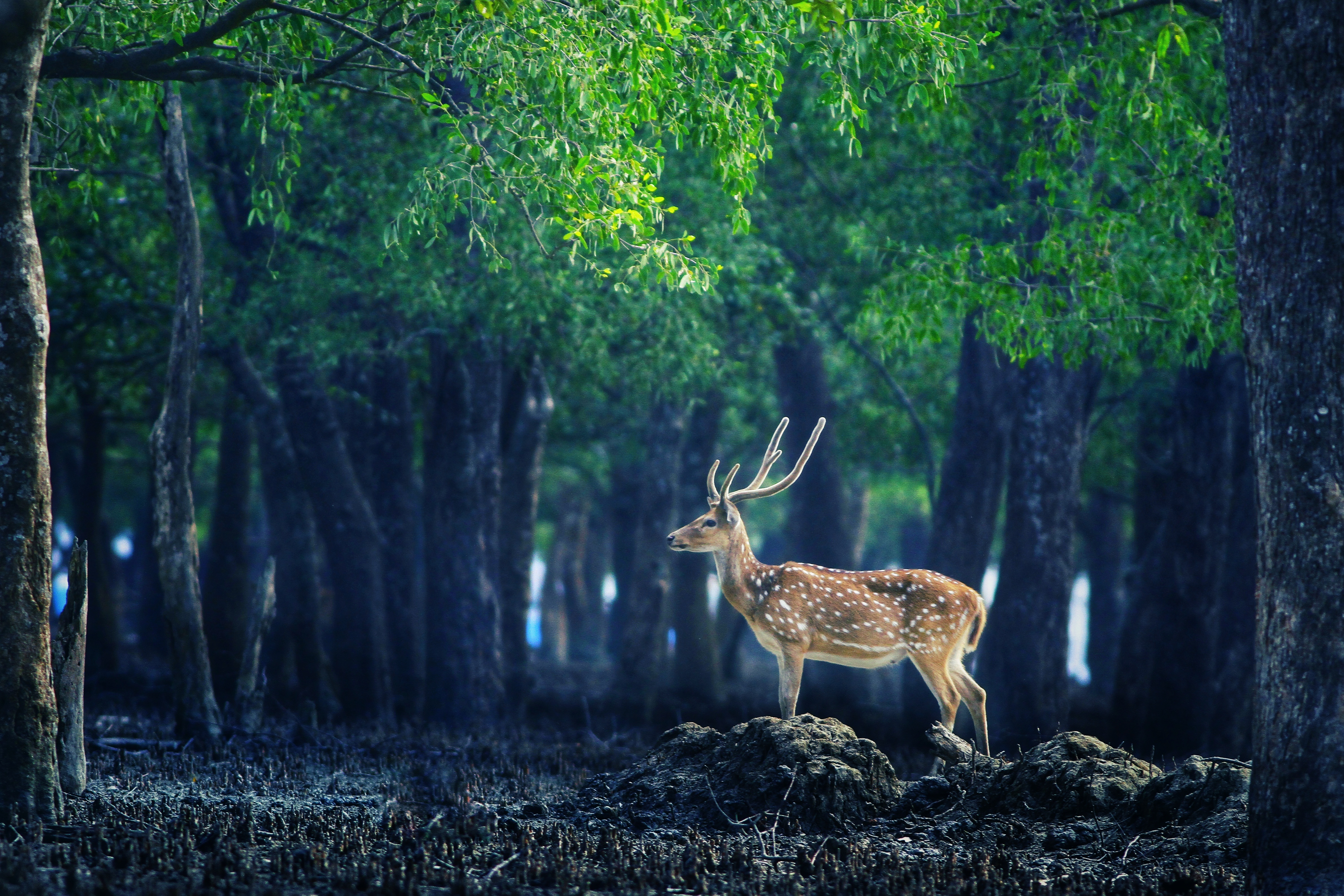
A deer in the Sundarbans, the largest mangrove forest in the world and a UNESCO World Heritage Site

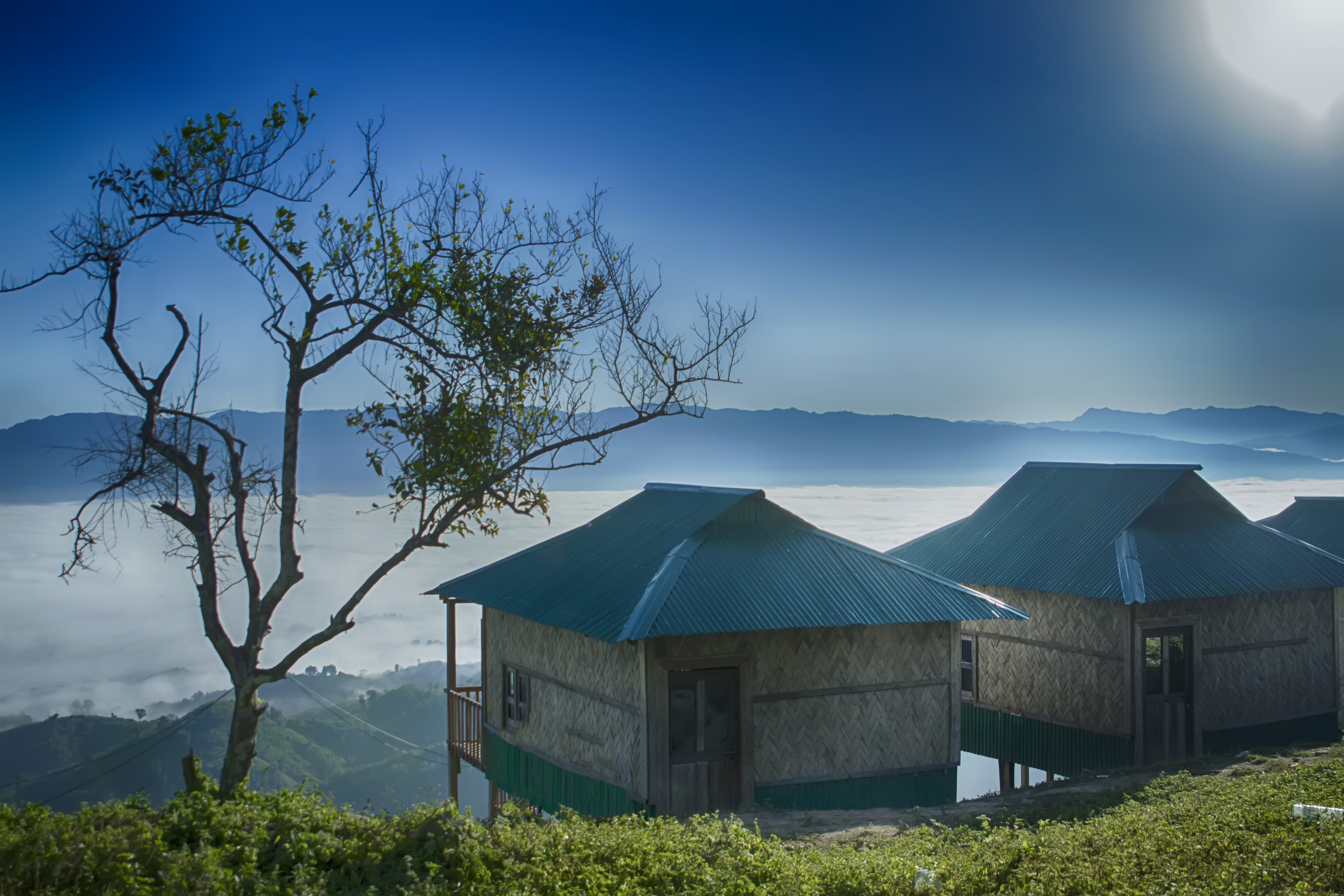
Sajek Valley in Rangamati, a site on the peak of the mountains

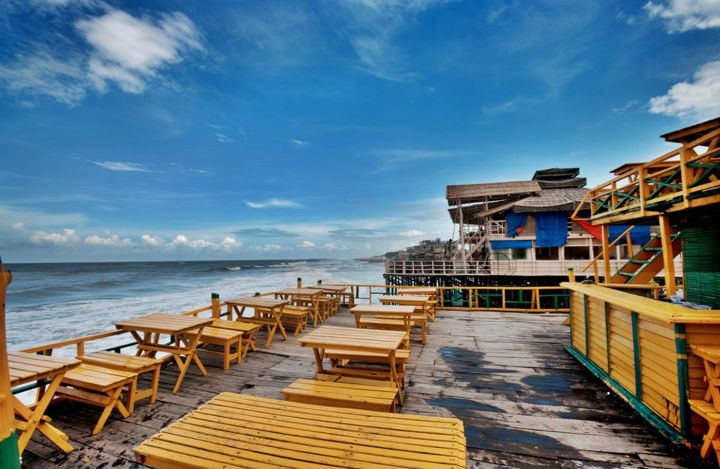
A beach restaurant in Cox's Bazar, the largest natural beach in the world

Tourism in Bangladesh (Note: Bengali: বাংলাদেশের পর্যটন, romanized: Baṅladeśer pôryôṭôn) includes tourism to World Heritage Sites, historical monuments, resorts, beaches, picnic spots, forests, tribal people, and wildlife of various species. Activities for tourists include angling, water skiing, river cruising, hiking, rowing, yachting, beachgoing and sea bathing.

In the northern part, comprising the Rangpur and Rajshahi Divisions, there are archaeological sites, including the temple city Puthia in Rajshahi; the largest and most ancient archaeological site, Mahasthangarh in Bogra; the single largest Buddhist monastery, Paharpur in Naogaon; the most ornamental terracotta Hindu temple, Kantaji Temple, and many rajbaris or palaces of old zamindars.

In the southeastern part of the Chittagong Division, there are natural and hilly areas like the Chittagong Hill Tracts, along with sandy sea beaches. The most notable beach, in Cox's Bazar, is a contender for the title of the longest unbroken sandy sea beach in the world.

In the southwestern part, mainly the Khulna Division, there is the Sundarbans, the largest mangrove forest in the world with the royal Bengal tiger and spotted deer. The historically and architecturally significant sixty domed mosques in Bagerhat are notable sites. In the northeastern part of the Sylhet division, there is a green carpet of tea plants on small hillocks. Natural reserved forests are great attractions. Migratory birds in winter are also beautiful, particularly in the haor areas.

The Ministry of Tourism and The Civil Aviation Ministry designs national policies for developing and promoting tourism. The Ministry also maintains the Beautiful Bangladesh campaign. Bangladesh Government has formed a Tourist Police unit to protect local and foreign tourists better and look after the nature and wildlife in the tourist spots.

== Economic impact ==
The World Travel and Tourism Council (WTTC) reported in 2026 that Bangladesh's travel and tourism industry directly generated 1.2% of the country's total employment in 2025, which ranked Bangladesh 164 out of 184 countries worldwide. A direct and indirect career in the industry totalled 3.6% of the country's total employment. The WTTC predicted that by 2036, travel and tourism would directly generate 1.3% of the country's total employment and support an overall total of 3.9% of the country's total employment. This would represent an annual growth rate of 1.9% in direct jobs. Domestic spending generated 96.5% of direct travel and tourism internal spending in 2025. Bangladesh's world ranking in 2025 for travel and tourism's direct contribution to GDP, as a percentage of GDP, was 169 out of 184.

- In 2024, 650,000 foreign tourists visited Bangladesh, an increase from 621,000 in 2019 and 552,000 in 2018.

== Chattogram Division ==
=== Cox's Bazar ===
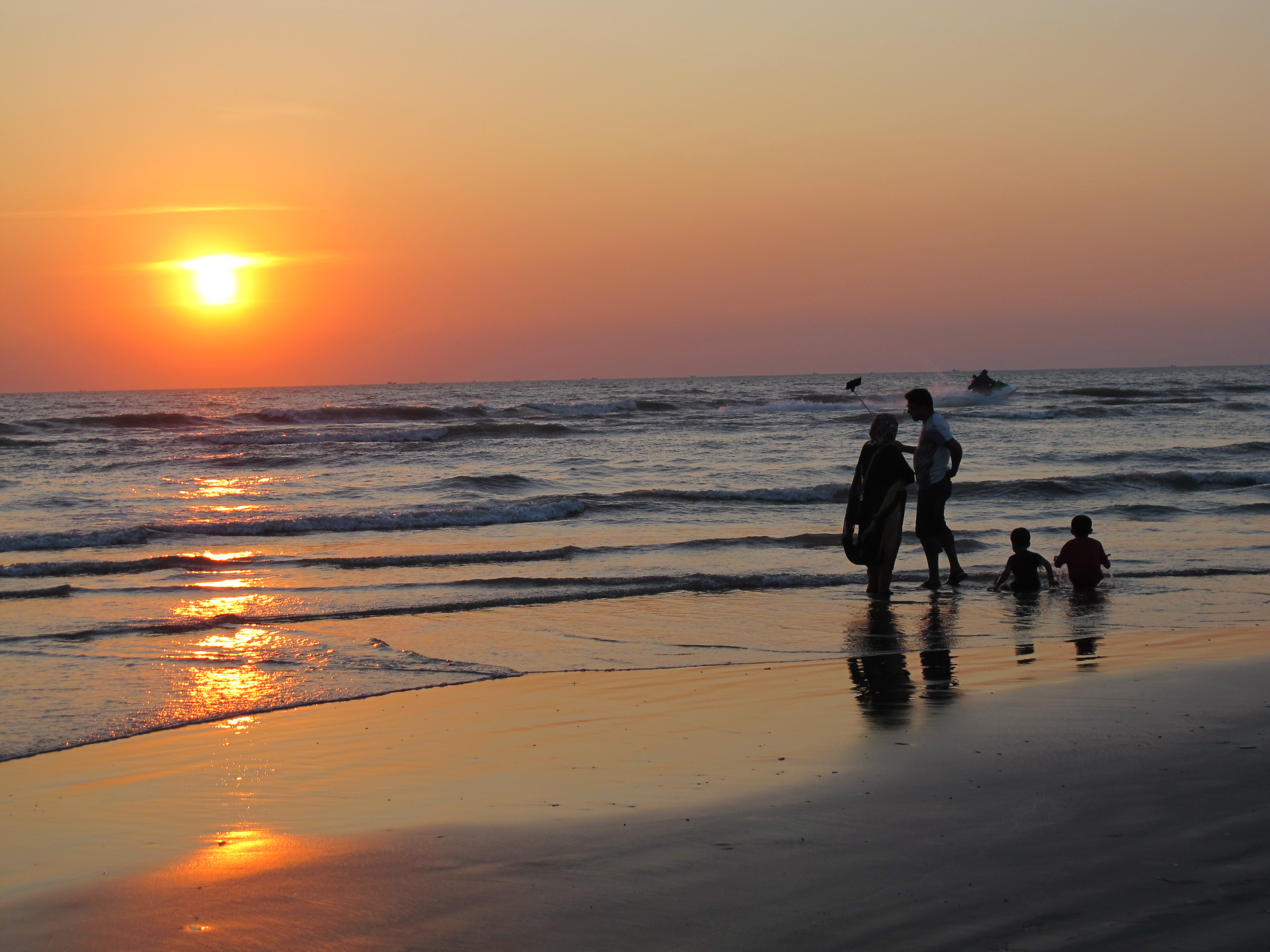
Sunset at Cox's Bazar

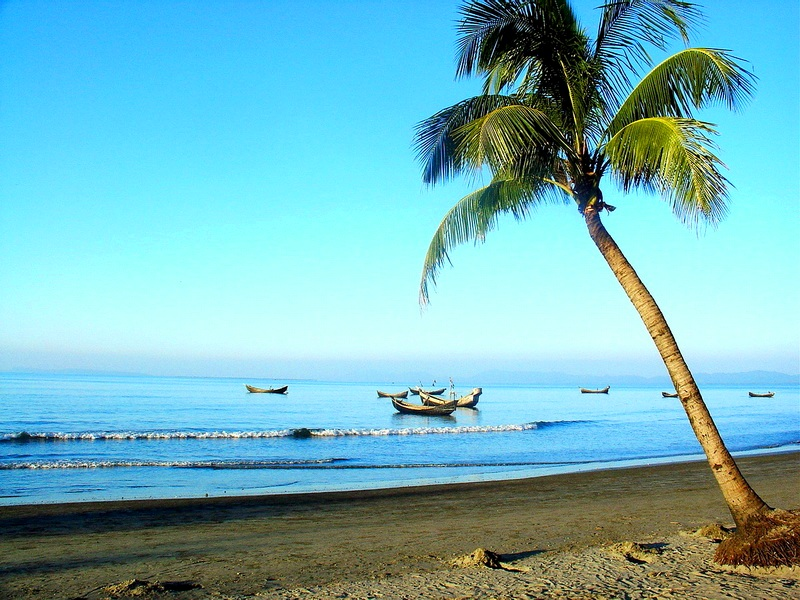
Beach view at St. Martin's Island

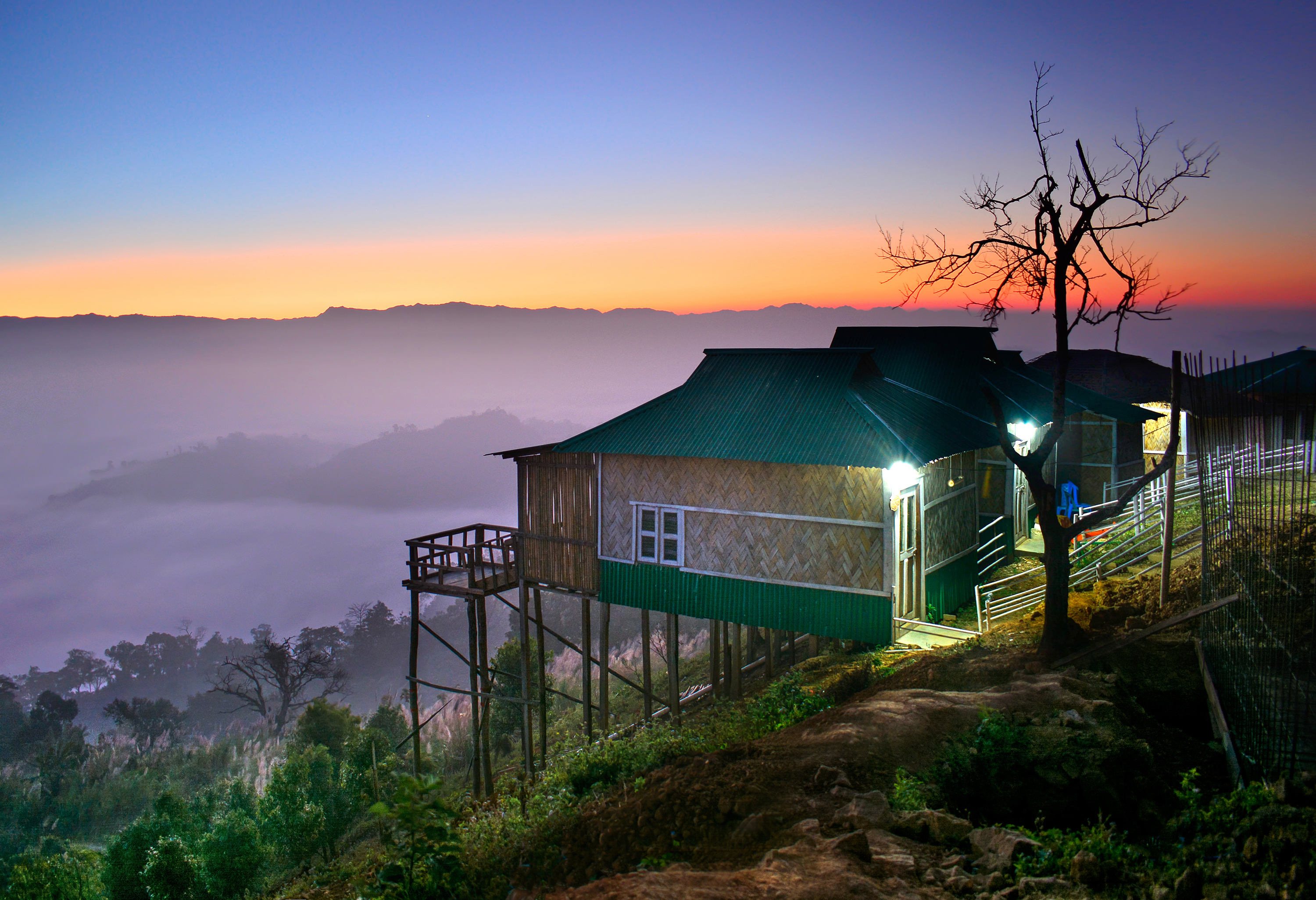
Highest Peaks of Sajek Valley

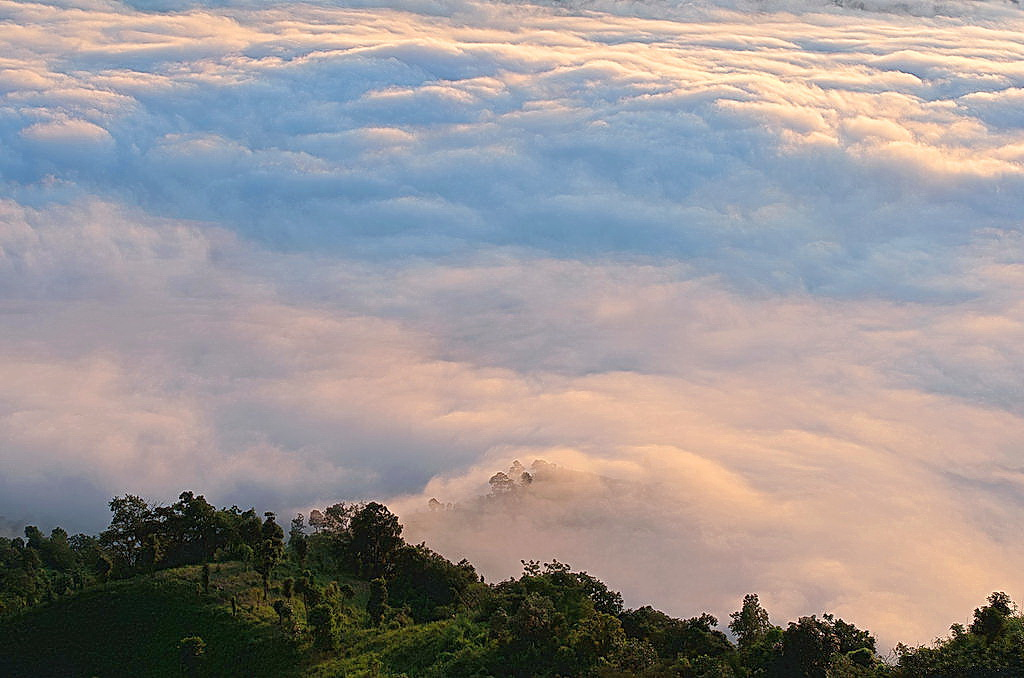
Clouds view from Nilgiri Mountains

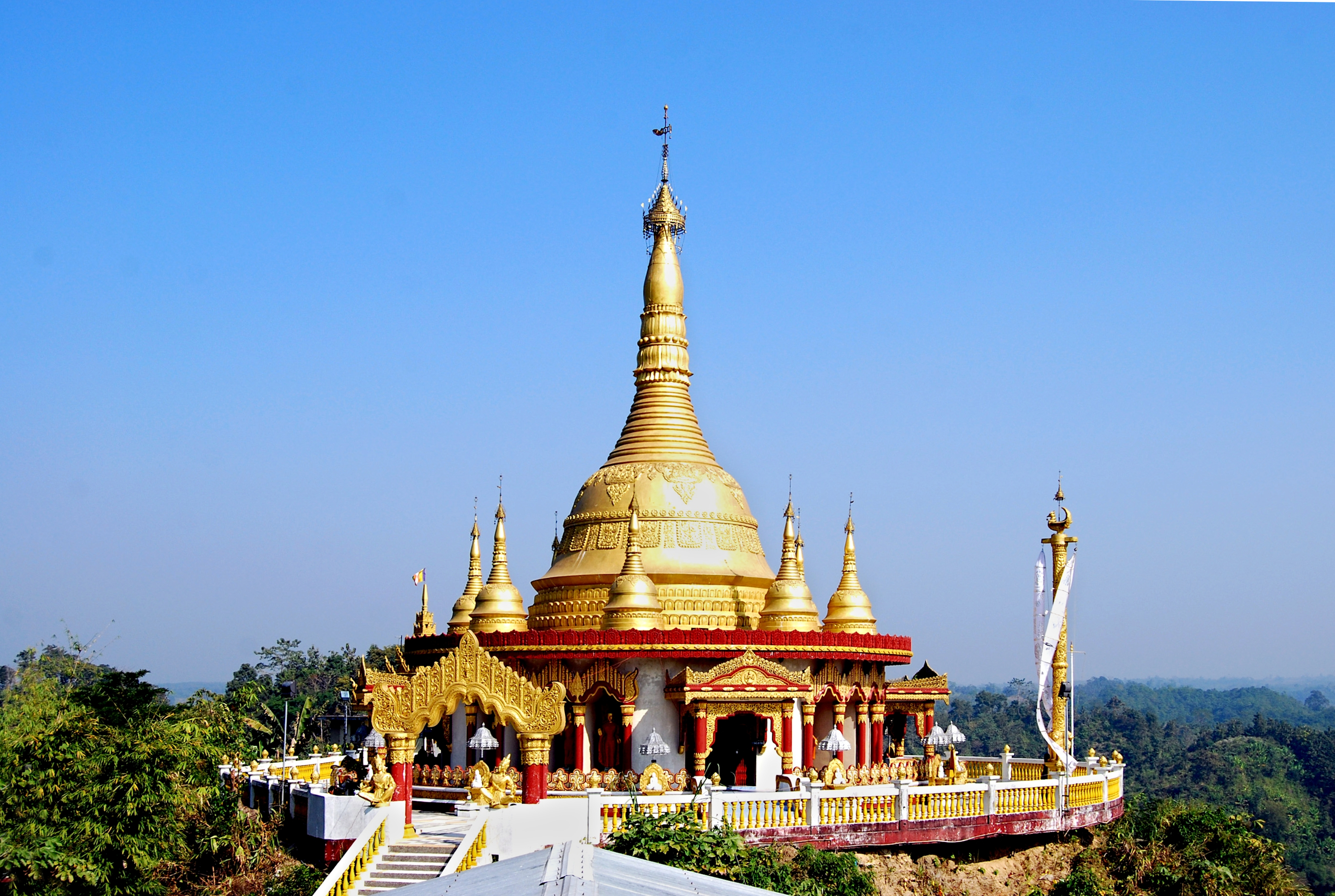
Buddha Dhatu Jadi, It is the largest Theravada Buddhist temple in Bangladesh and has the second-largest Buddha statue in the country.

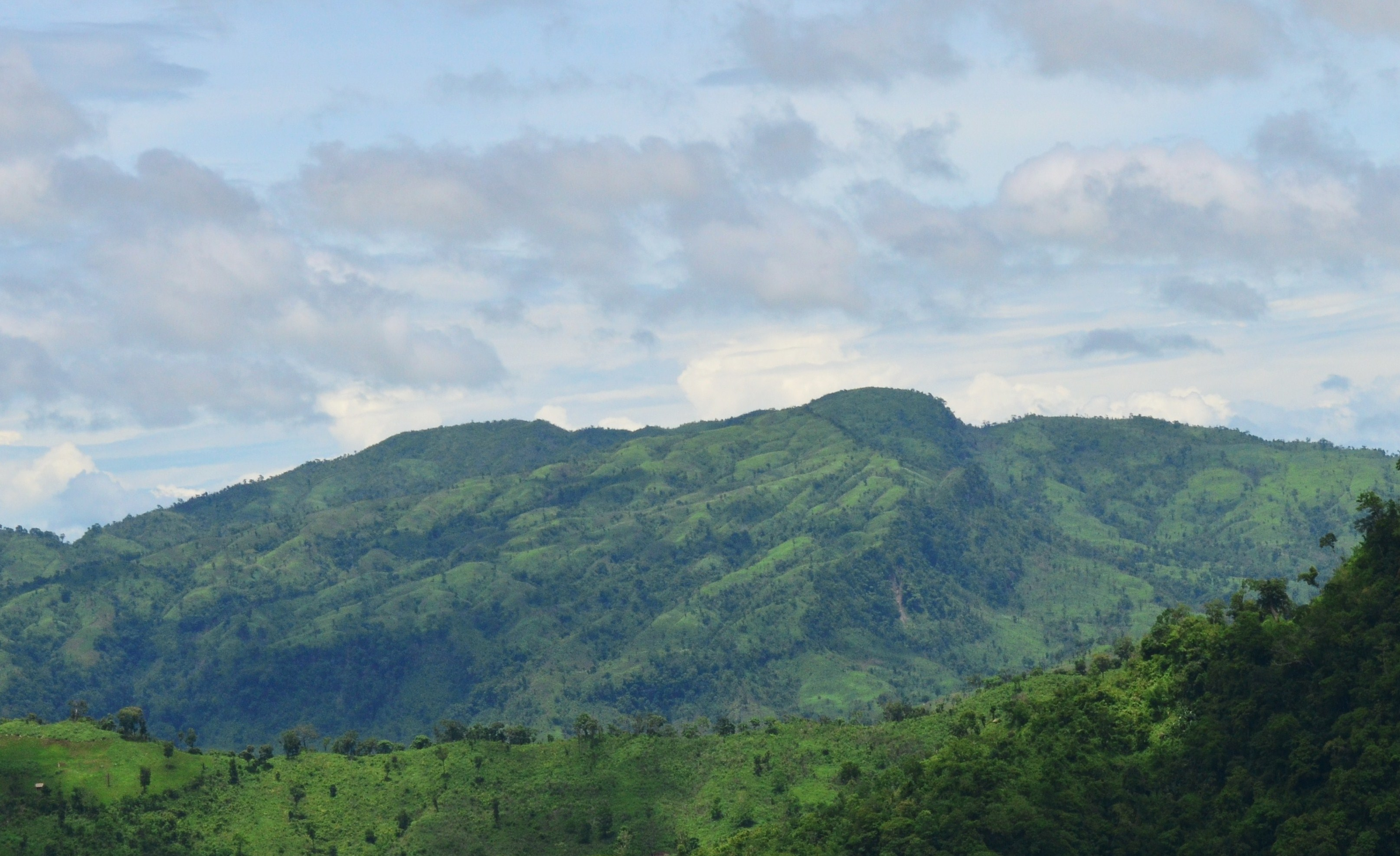
Dumlong, the tallest mountain of Rangamati

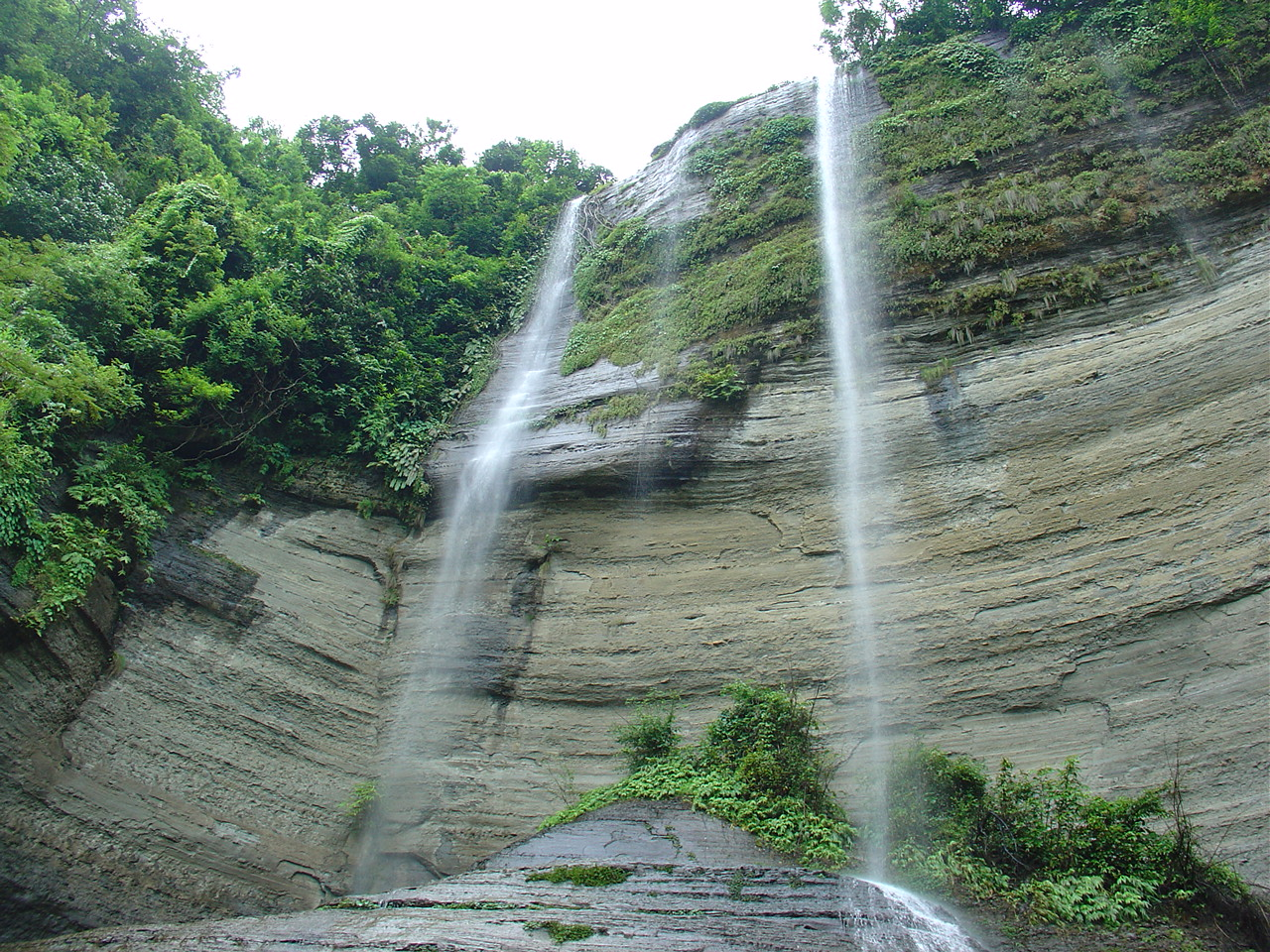
Shubhalang waterfall, Rangamati

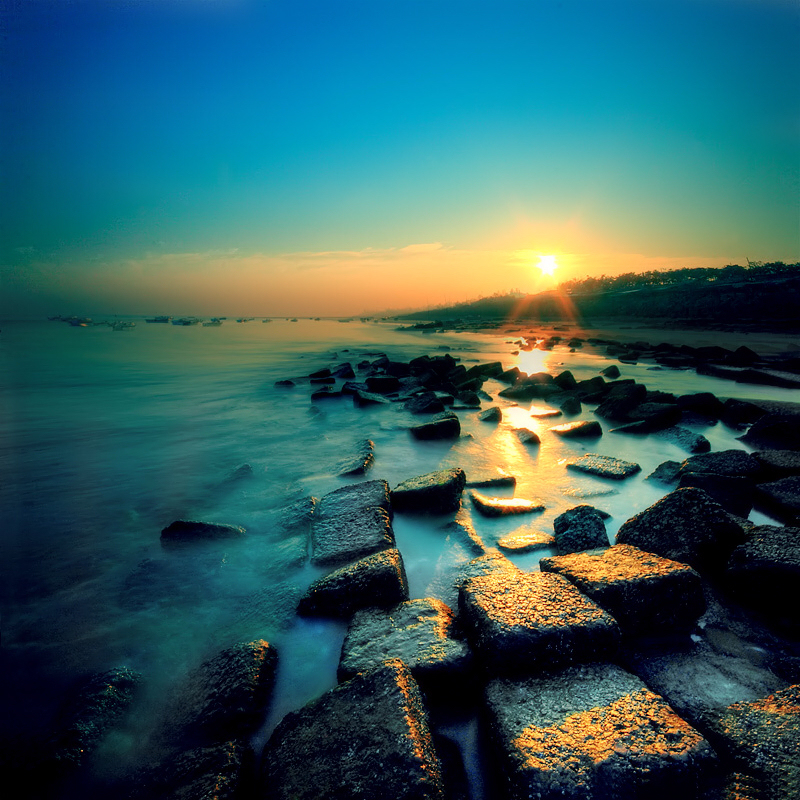
Sunset at Patenga beach

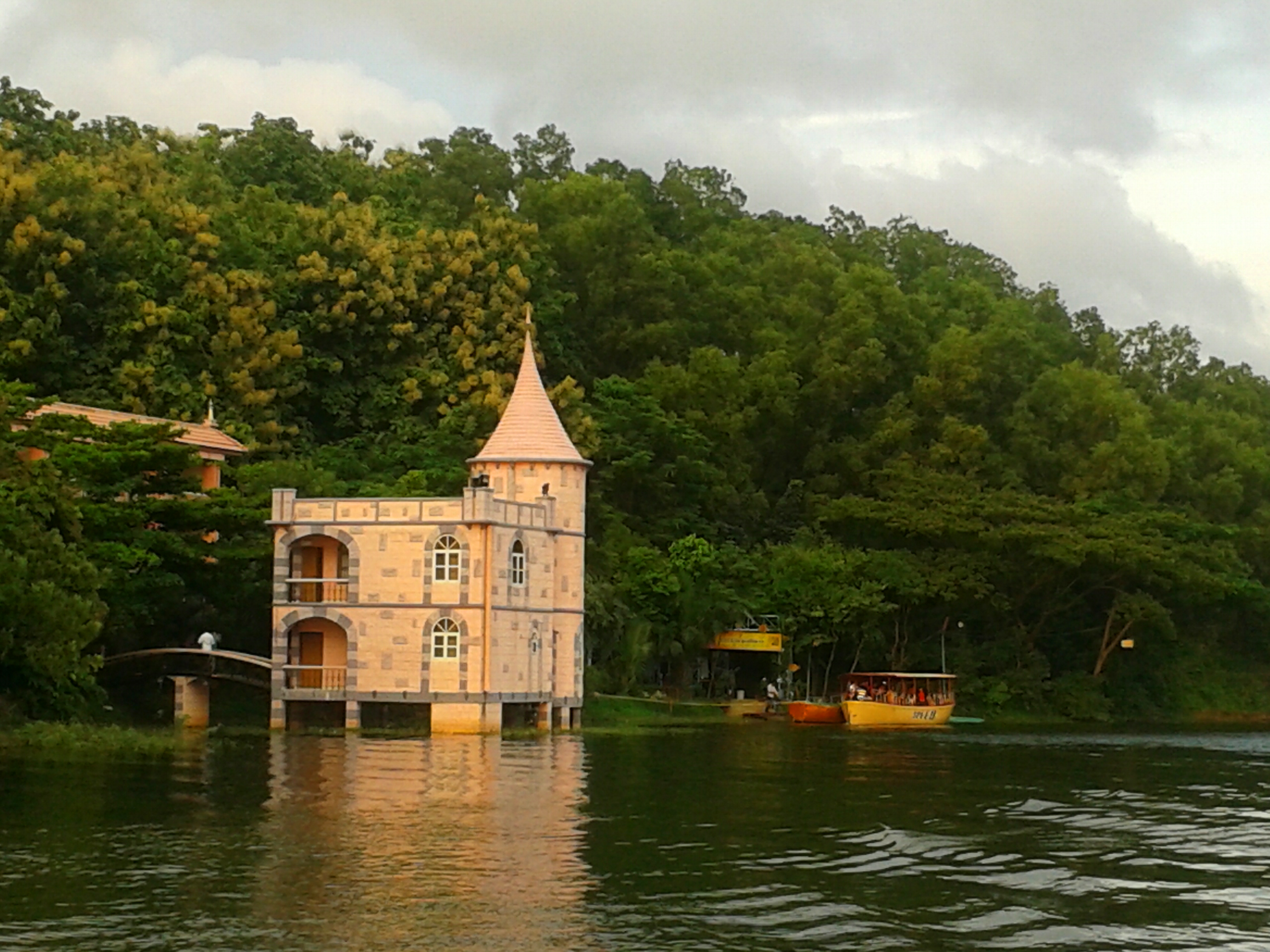
Foy's Lake in Pahartali

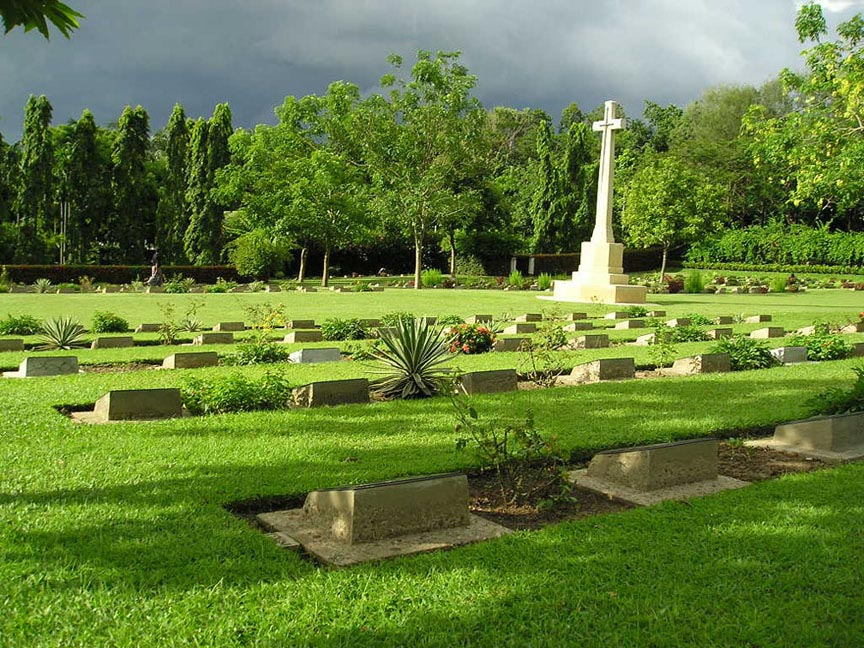
Chittagong War Cemetery

Cox's Bazar is a seaside town, a fishing port and district headquarters in Bangladesh. It is known for its wide and long sandy beach, which is considered by many as the world's longest natural sandy sea beach. The Cox’s Bazar beach stretches unbroken for about 125 kilometres (78 mi) and features a gentle slope into the Bay of Bengal. It is 152 kilometres (94 mi) south of the Chittagong Seaport. Cox's Bazar is also known by the name Panowa, whose literal translation means "yellow flower". Its other old name was "Palongkee".

=== St. Martin's Island ===
St. Martin's Island is a small island (area only 8 km2) in the northeastern part of the Bay of Bengal, about 9 km south of the tip of the Cox's Bazar-Teknaf peninsula, and forming the southernmost part of Bangladesh. There is a small adjoining island that is separated at high tide, called Chhera island. It is about 8 km west of the northwest coast of Myanmar, at the mouth of the Naf River. The first settlement started just 250 years ago by some Arabian sailors, who named the island 'Zajira'. During British occupation, the island was named St. Martin Island. The local names of the island are "Narical Gingira", also spelled "Narikel Jinjira/Jinjera", which means 'Coconut Island' in Bengali, and "Daruchini Dip". It is the only coral island in Bangladesh.

The city of Chittagong has many high end, private hotels such as the Hotel Agrabad, the Hotel Well Park Residence, The Peninsula Chittagong, the Hotel Harbour View, the Hotel Meridian, and Avenue Hotels and Suites.

The JW Marriott, Westin and Radisson Blu are among the upcoming five-star hotels in Chittagong city.

=== Chandpur Mohona Boro Station ===
Chandpur, known as the 'Home of Hilsa', is equally admired for its riverside landscape. At Boro Station, the Chandpur Mohona offers an extensive view of the confluence of the Padma, Meghna and Dakatia rivers which create a vast stretch of water against the horizon. It sits right next to one of Bangladesh's largest wholesale Hilsa fish landing and trading centers, and features local landmarks including a large Hilsa sculpture and the Raktadhara Memorial, which honors the martyrs of the 1971 Liberation War.

=== Sajek Valley ===
Sajek Valley is an emerging tourist spot in Bangladesh situated among the hills of the Kasalong range of mountains in Sajek union, Baghaichhari Upazila in Rangamati District, Chittagong. The valley is 1,476 feet (450 m) above sea level. Sajek valley is known as the Queen of Hills & Roof of Rangamati. The name of Sajek Valley came from the Sajek River that originates from Karnafuli river. The Sajek river works as a border between Bangladesh and India.

=== Bandarban District ===
Bandarban is a district in South-Eastern Bangladesh, and a part of the Chittagong. Bandarban is regarded by many tourists to be one of the most attractive travel destinations in Bangladesh. Bandarban (meaning the dam of monkeys), or in Marma or Arakanese language as "Rwa-daw Mro" is also known as Arvumi or the Bohmong Circle (of the rest of the three hill districts Rangamati is the Chakma Circle, Raja Devasish Roy and Khagrachhari is the Mong Circle, Raja Sachingprue Marma). Bandarban town is the hometown of the Bohmong Circle Chief (currently King, or Raja, U Cho Prue Marma) who is the head of the Marma population. It also is the administrative headquarters of Bandarban district, which has turned into one of the most exotic tourist attractions in Bangladesh.

=== Rangamati ===
Rangamati is the administrative headquarters of Rangamati Hill District in the Chittagong. Kaptai lake, the hanging bridge and Pablakhali reserve forest are some of the notable locations to visit in Rangamati.

=== Khagrachhari District ===
Khagrachhari is a district in south-eastern Bangladesh. It is a part of the Chittagong. Its local name is "Chengmi". Khagrachari is also known as Phalang Htaung (ဖလံေထာင္) or the Mong Circle (of the rest of the three hill districts Rangamati is the Chakma Circle (သက္ေထာင္) and Bandarban (ဗိုလ္မင္းေထာင္) is the Bohmong Circle). Tourist destinations in Khagrachari include Alutila Cave, Richhang waterfall, Yonged Buddha Bihar and the Dighinala Touduchhori Waterfall.

=== Patenga beach ===
Patenga is a sea beach located south of the Chittagong City. It is near the mouth of the Karnaphuli River. Patenga is a popular tourist spot. The beach is very close to the Bangladesh Naval Academy of the Bangladesh Navy and Chittagong Shah Amanat International Airport. Its width is narrow and swimming in the seas is not recommended. Part of the seashore is built-up with concrete walls, and large blocks of stones have been laid to prevent erosion. During the 1990s, a host of restaurants and kiosks sprouted out around the beach area. Lighting of the area has enhanced the security aspect of visiting at night. It is guarded by large stones to protect it from tsunamis.

A tourist attraction near Patenga beach is the Butterfly Park.

=== Foy's Lake ===
Foy's Lake is a human-made lake in Chittagong City. The lake was once just a lake and spillway constructed by Assam-Bengal Railway engineer. It was dug in 1924 and was named after the English engineer Mr. Foy. The lake is next to Batali Hill, the highest hill in Chittagong Metropolitan area. An amusement park, managed by the Concord Group, is located here.

=== Heritage Park ===
There is a heritage park called Shaheed Zia Memorial Complex and Mini Bangladesh at Chandgaon which reflects the most notable structures and instances of Bangladesh. This 71-metre tower in Mini Bangladesh in Chittagong has a restaurant on the top that rotates once every 90 minutes. The museum includes a revolving restaurant. One can perceive of the country's architectural beauty, ethnic traditions and archaeological inheritance through having a glimpse of the heritage park. Replicas of major structures of the country include Jatiya Sangsad Bhaban (parliament building), National Memorial of Savar, Ahsan Manzil, Curzon Hall of Dhaka University, Paharpur Monastery, Kantajew Temple of Dinajpur, Lalbagh Fort and Sona Masjid. The park also has different rides for children.

=== Ethnological Museum of Chittagong ===
The Ethnological Museum of Chittagong located in Agrabad, established in 1965, is the only ethnological museum in the country, and presents the lifestyles and heritage of various ethnic groups of the country. The museum authority collected rare elements used in everyday lives of different ethnic groups, of which some had already become extinct while others were on the verge of extinction. The museum contains four galleries and a small hall. Three galleries of the museum feature diverse elements of twenty nine ethnic groups in Bangladesh, while the rest of the gallery displays the lifestyles of some ethnic groups of India, Pakistan and Australia.

=== WWII cemetery and Circuit ===
The War Cemetery on Badshah Mia Road contains the graves of 755 soldiers, and is protected and maintained by the Commonwealth War Graves Commission. There are a number of museums in Chittagong. The most prominent is the Zia Memorial Museum which is housed in the old circuit house building. President Ziaur Rahman was assassinated there on 30 May 1981. This commemorative museum houses the late President Ziaur Rahman's mementos and personal belongings. It was established in 1993 with 12 galleries.

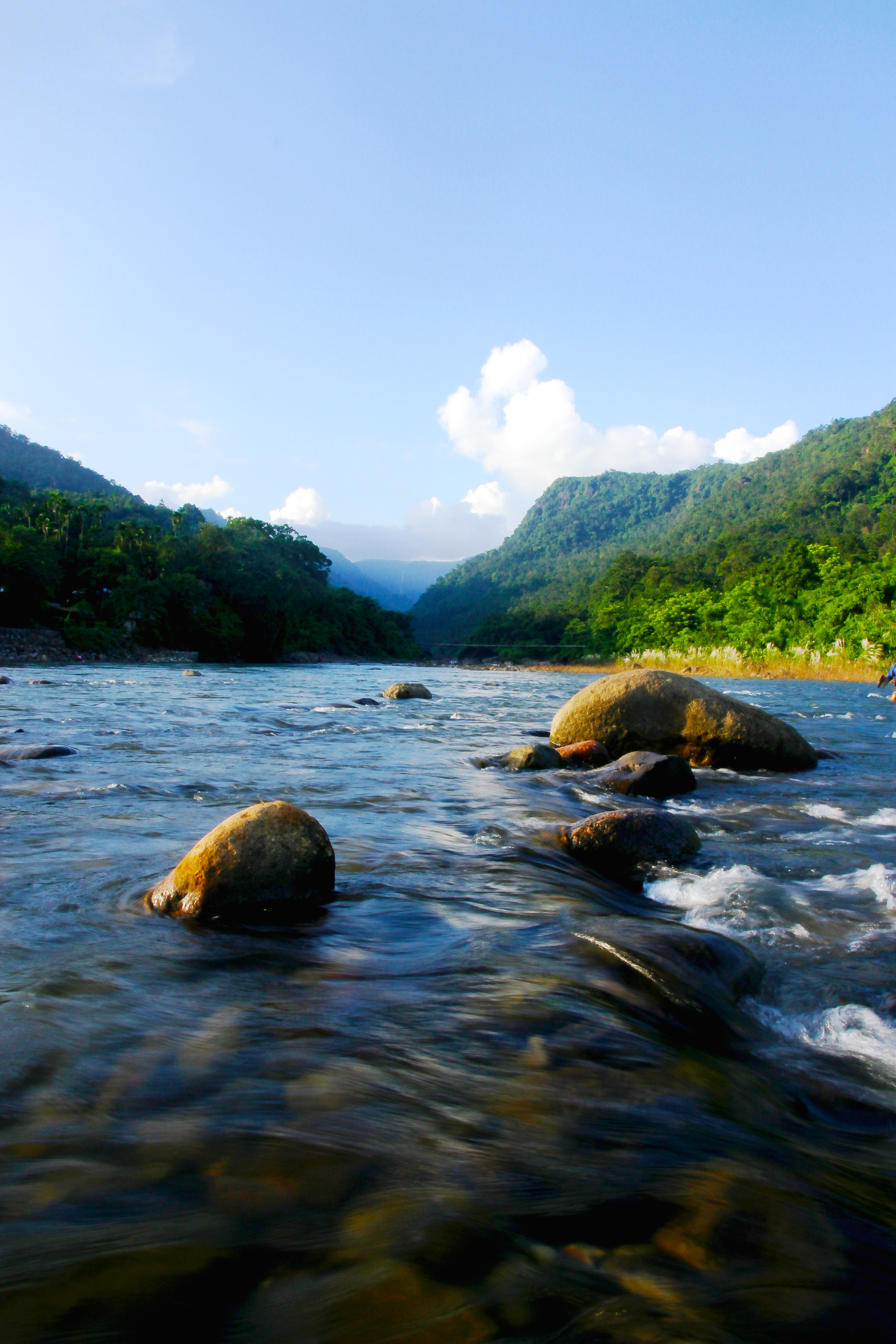
Rocky Streams in Bichnakandi

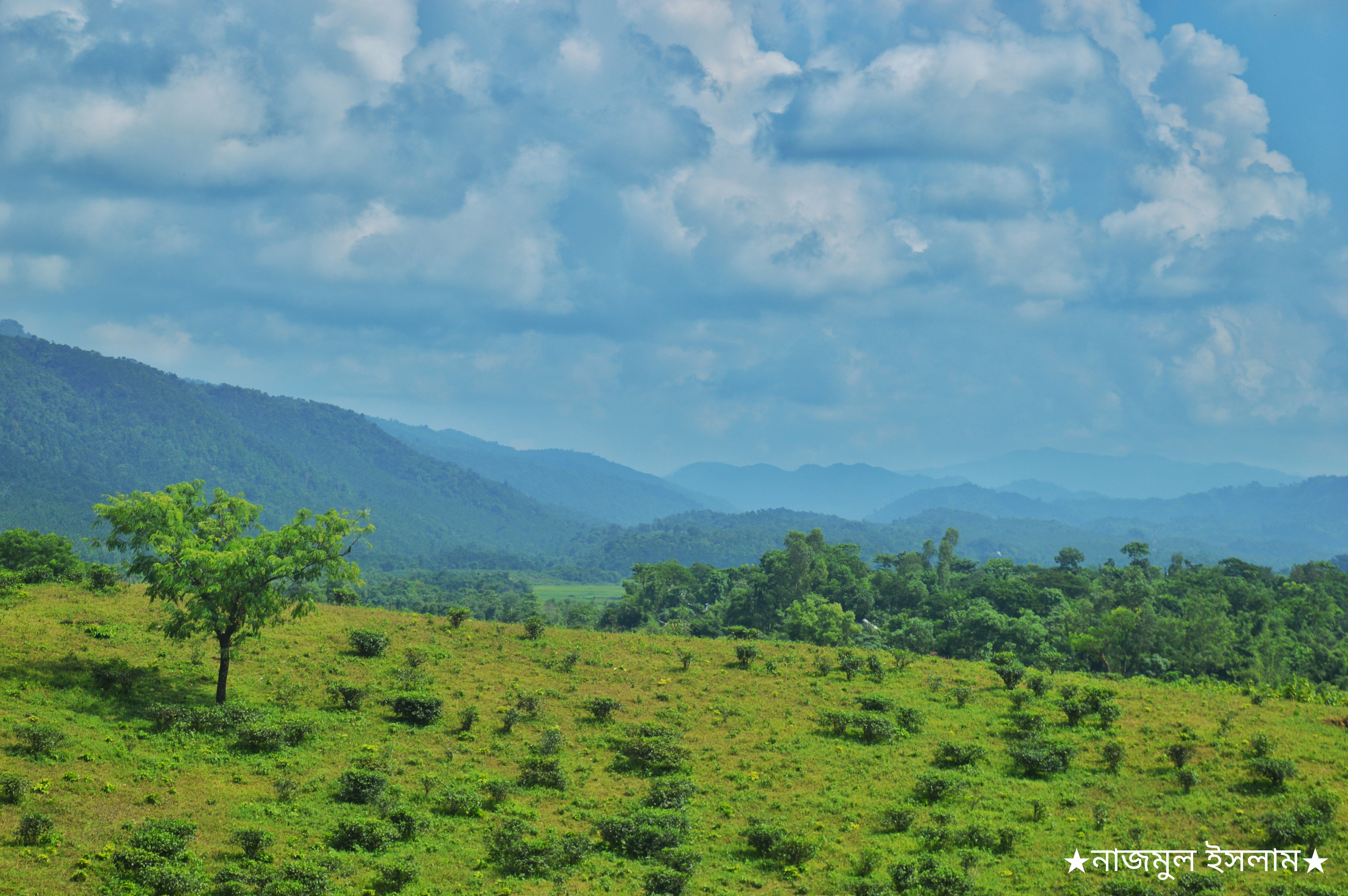
Jaflong attracts tourists for its sceneries

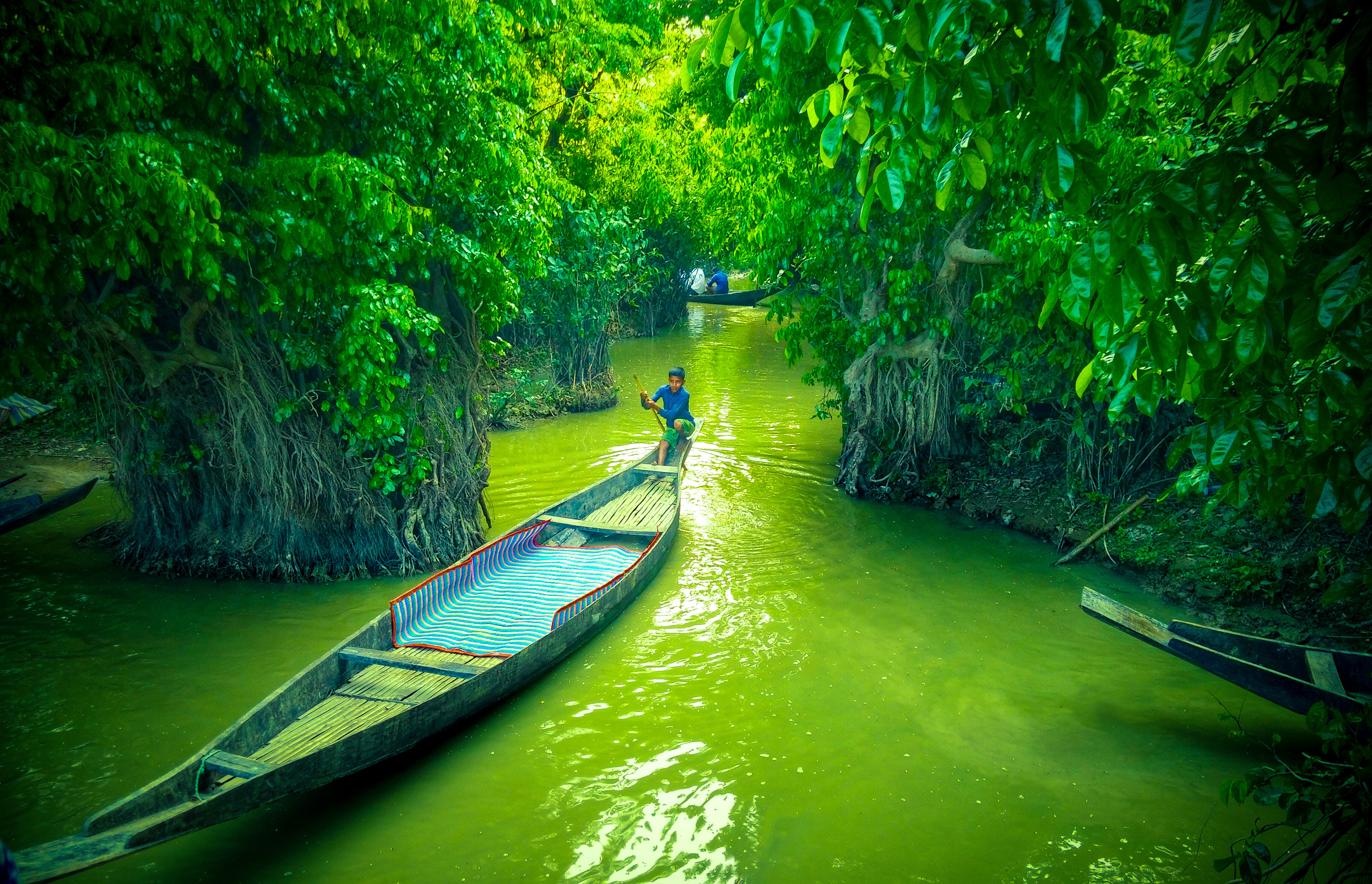
Ratargul Swamp forest Entrance

== Sylhet Division ==
=== Bichnakandi ===
Bichnakandi is a village in Rustompur Union in Gowainghat Upazila of Sylhet District. In recent years there has been an influx of tourists to its river.

=== Jaflong ===
Jaflong is a hill station and popular tourist destination in the Division of Sylhet, Bangladesh. It is located in Gowainghat Upazila of Sylhet District and situated at the border between Bangladesh and the Indian state of Meghalaya, overshadowed by subtropical mountains and rainforests. Jaflong is famous for its stone collections and is home of the Khasi tribe.

=== Madhobpur Lake ===
Madhobpur Lake is a lake of Srimangal in Maulvi Bazar District of Bangladesh. It is one of the popular tourist spot in Bangladesh.

=== Ratargul Swamp Forest ===
Ratargul Swamp Forest is a freshwater swamp forest located in Gowainghat, Sylhet. It is the only swamp forest located in Bangladesh and one of the few freshwater swamp forest in the world. The forest is naturally conserved under the Department of Forestry, Govt. of Bangladesh.

The evergreen forest is situated by the river Goain and linked with the channel Chengir Khal. Most of the trees growing here are the Millettia pinnata (করচ গাছ "Koroch tree"). The forest is submerged under 20–30 feet water in the rainy season. For the rest of the year, the water level is about 10 feet deep.

== Dhaka Division ==
Dhaka Division is an administrative division in Bangladesh. Dhaka (formerly "Dacca") is the largest and capital city of Bangladesh.

=== Lalbagh Fort ===
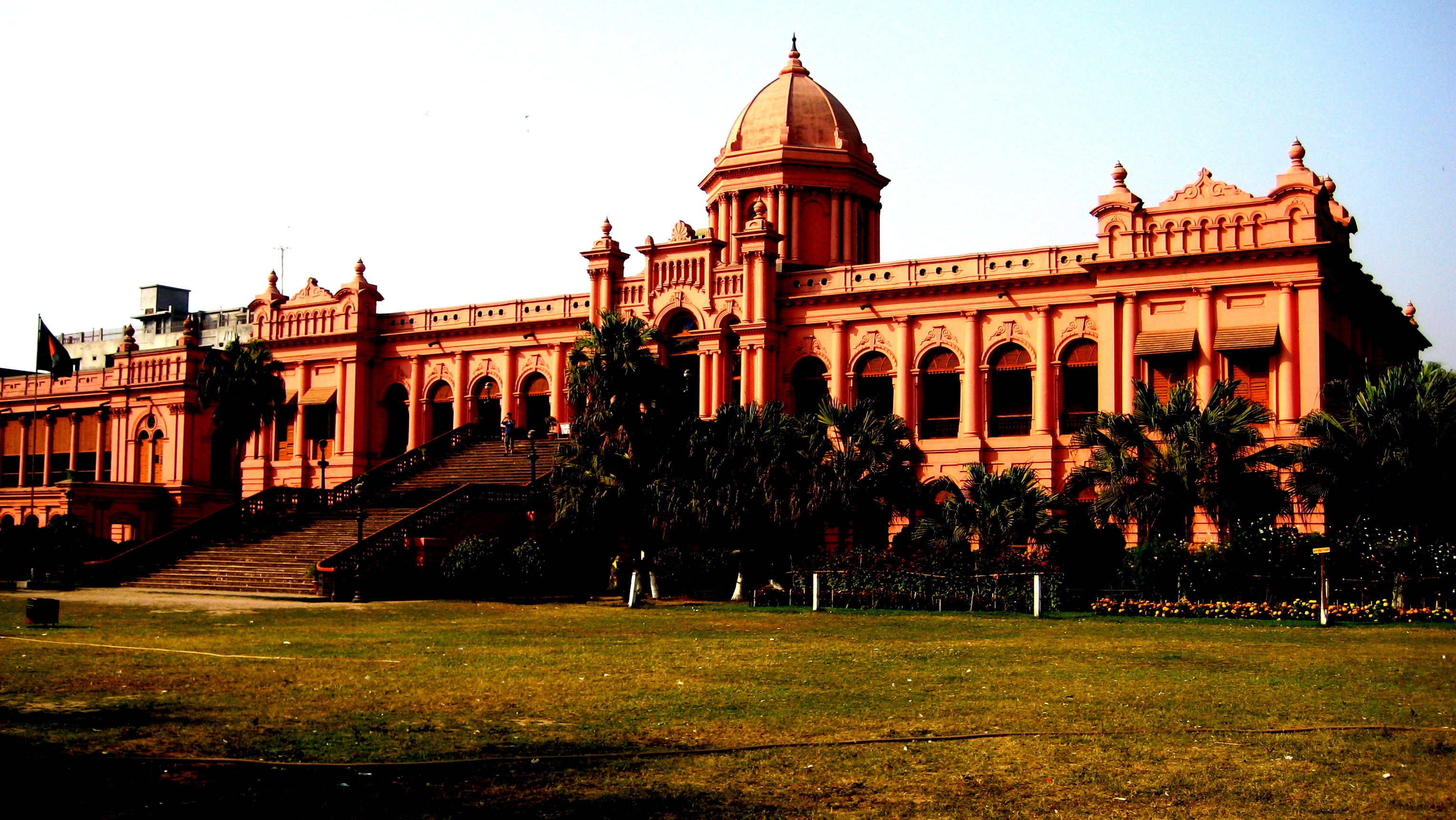
Ahsan Manzil, where Nawabs of Bengal used to gather

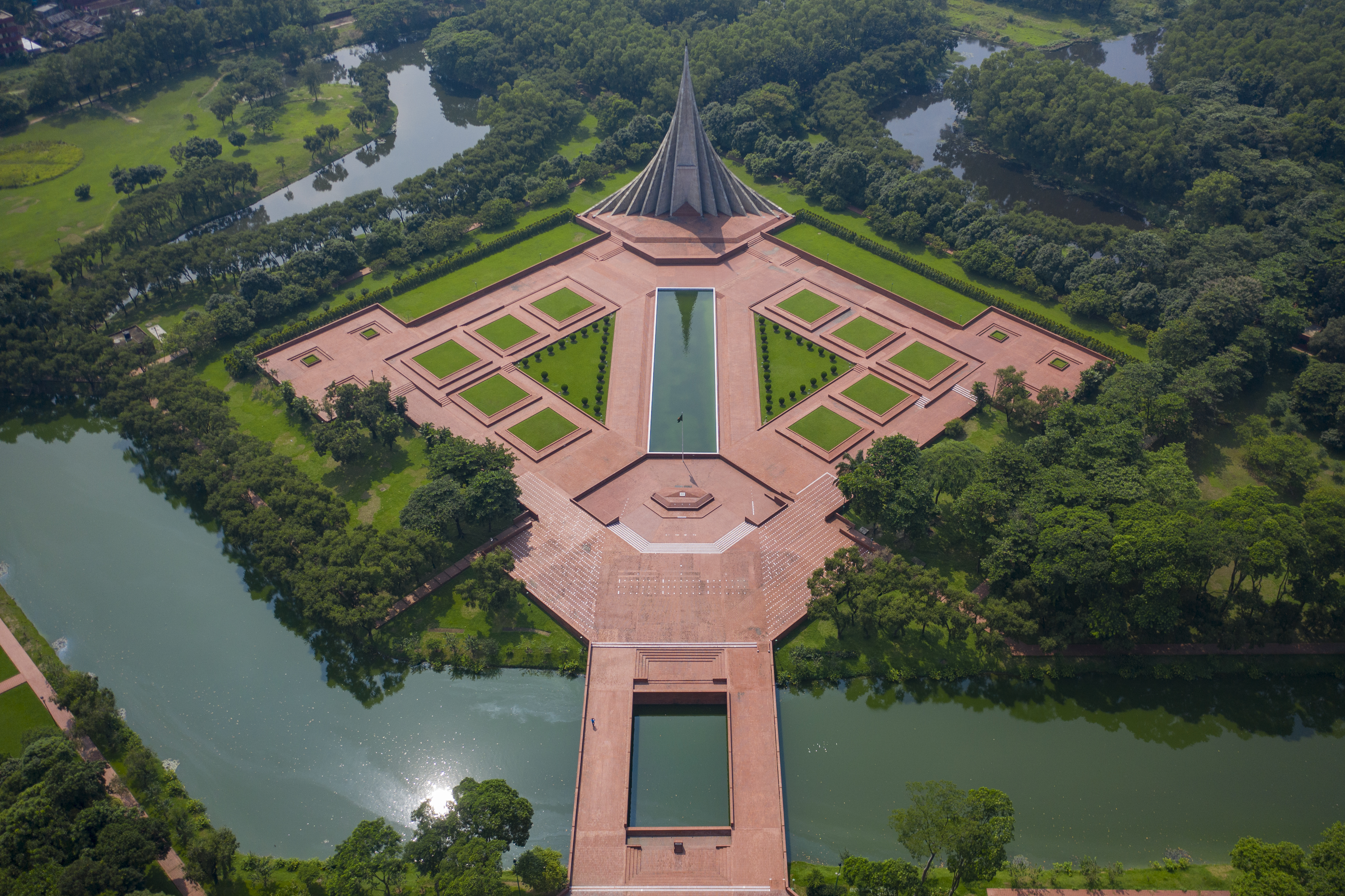
Jatiyo Smriti Soudho is the national monument of Bangladesh

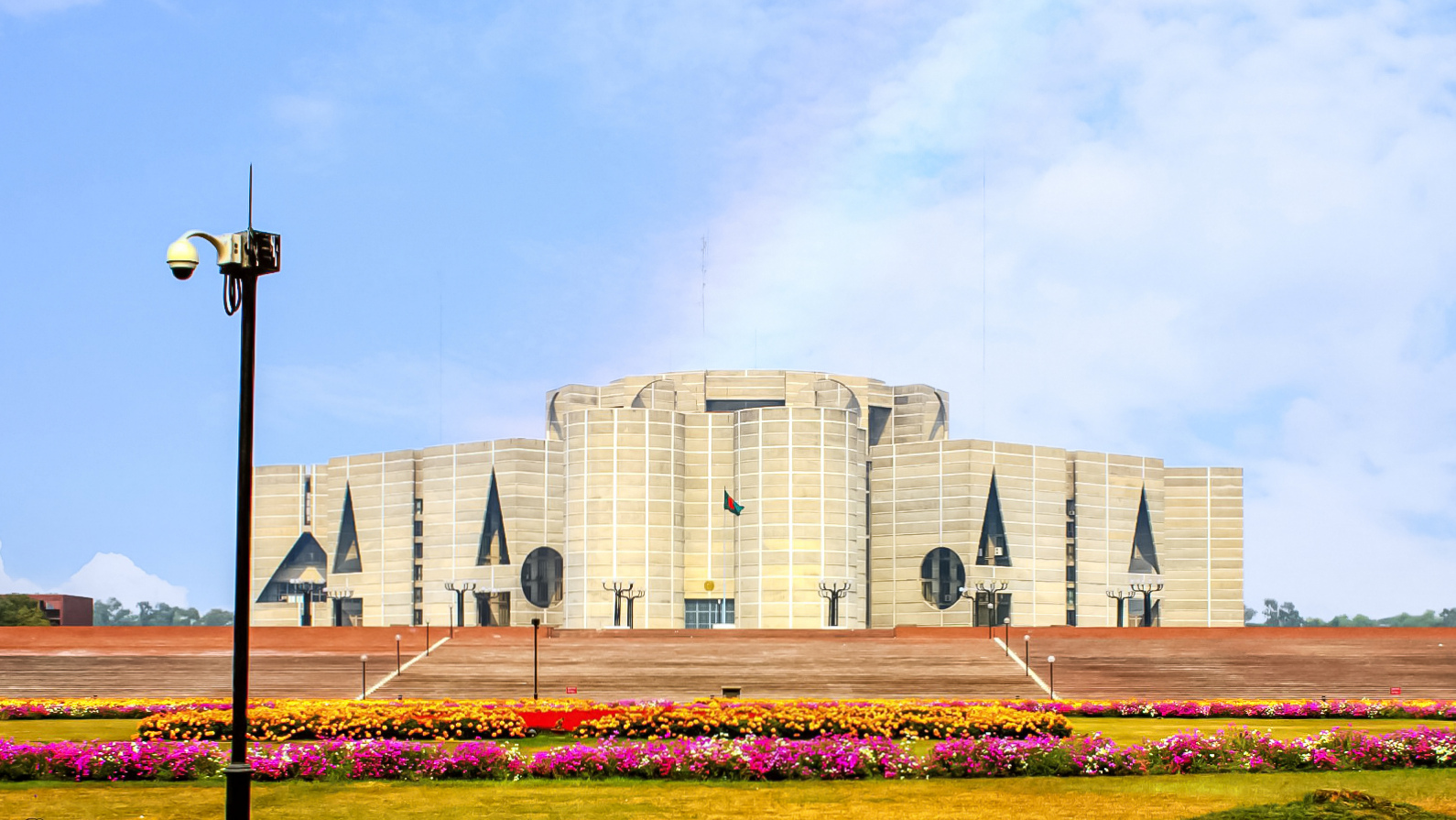
Bangladesh Parliament Assembly Hall

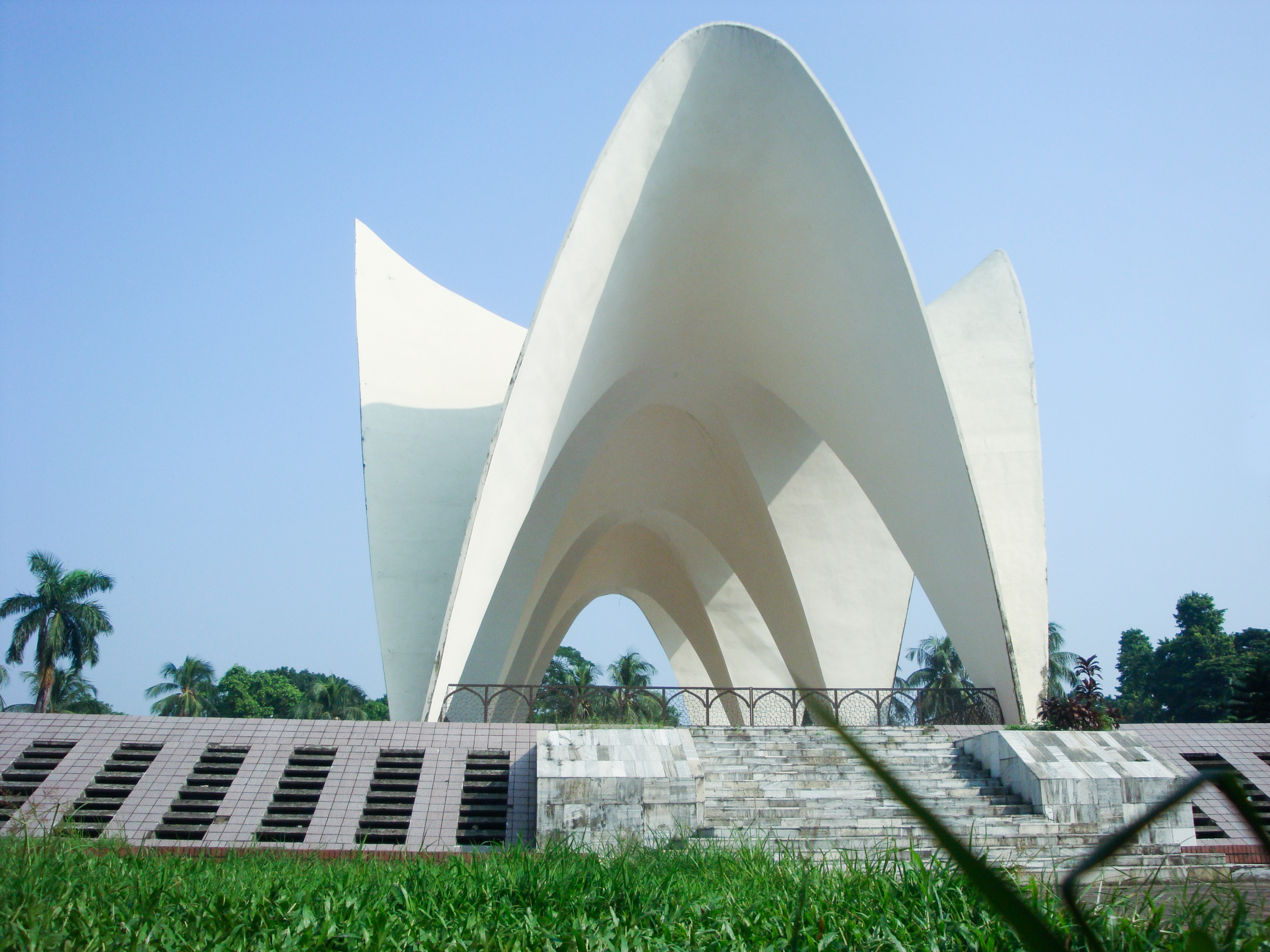
Tin Netar Majar at Suhrawardy Udyan. Built in the remembrance of the three founding fathers of East Pakistan. Which were A. K. Fazlul Huq, Huseyn Shaheed Suhrawardy and Khwaja Nazimuddin.

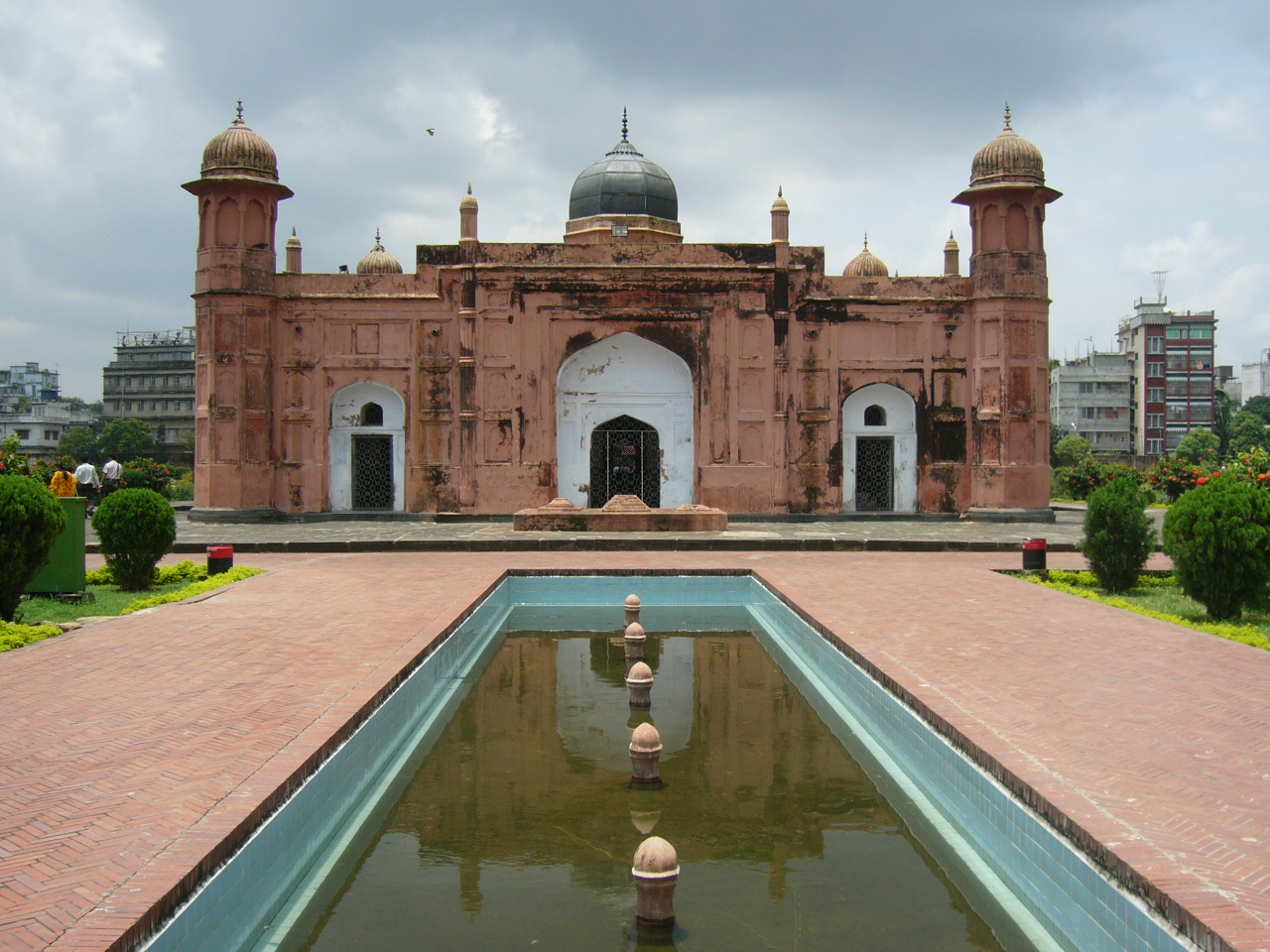
Lalbagh Fort, Dhaka, Bangladesh

Lalbagh Fort is an incomplete 17th century Mughal fort complex in Dhaka, Bangladesh. This fort (Also known as Fort Aurangabad) stands proudly before the Buriganga River in the southwestern part of Dhaka, Bangladesh. The construction was started in 1678 AD by Mughal Subahdar Muhammad Azam Shah. For long the fort was considered to be a combination of three buildings (the mosque, the tomb of Bibi Pari and the Diwan-i-Aam), with two gateways and a portion of the partly damaged fortification wall. Recent excavations carried out by the Department of Archaeology have revealed the existence of other structures.

=== Ahsan Manzil ===
Ahsan Manzil is a wonderful ancient building, located on the bank of the river Buriganga, in old Dhaka at Kumartoli, Islampur area. It was a residential palace for Dhaka Nawab Family. The structure of this palace was started in the year 1859 and was finished in 1869. It is constructed in the Indo-Saracenic Revival architecture. To preserve the cultural and history of the area, the palace became the Bangladesh National Museum on 20 September 1992.

=== Shaheed Minar ===
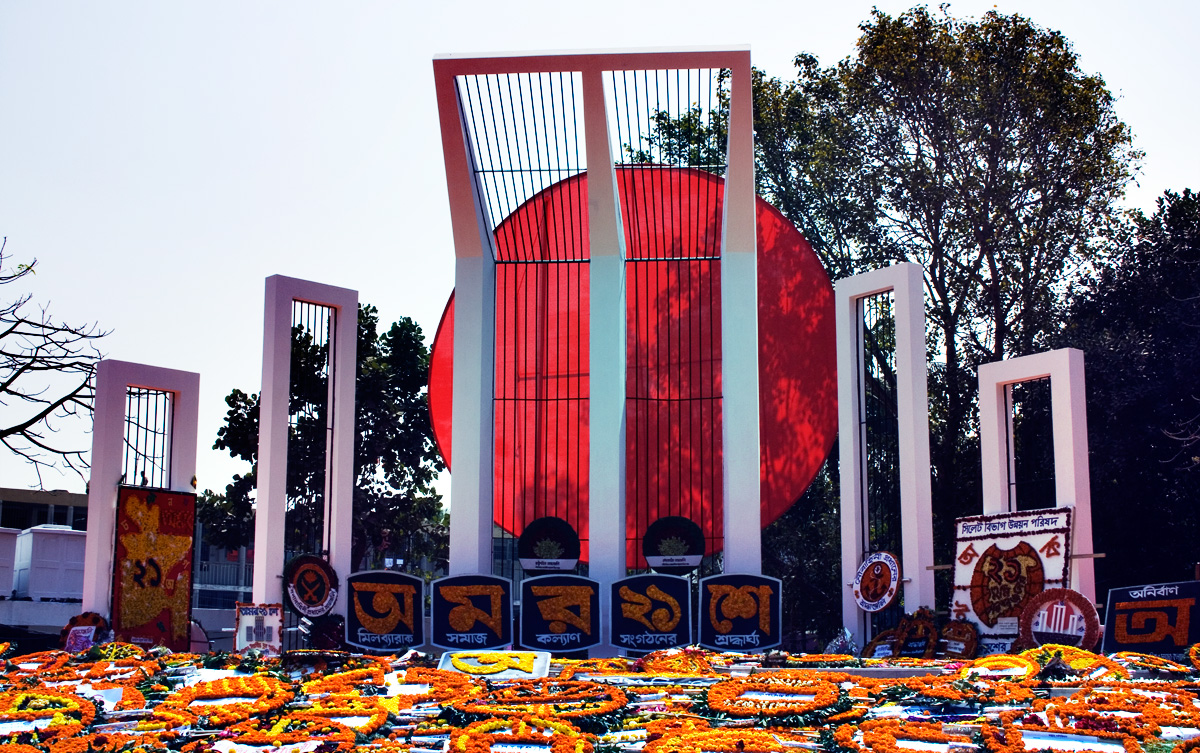
Shaheed Minar, is one of the most important monuments of the country.

The Shaheed Minar (English: Martyr Monument) is a national monument in Dhaka, Bangladesh, established to commemorate those killed during the Bengali language movement demonstrations of 1952. On 21 February 1952, dozens of students and political activists were killed when the Pakistani police force opened fire on Bengali protesters who were demanding equal status for their native tongue, Bengali. The massacre occurred near Dhaka Medical College and Ramna Park in Dhaka. A makeshift monument was erected on 23 February by students of University of Dhaka and other educational institutions, but demolished on 26 February by the Pakistani police force. The Language Movement gained momentum, and after a long struggle, Bengali was given equal status with Urdu. To commemorate the dead, the Shaheed Minar was designed and built by Hamidur Rahman, a Bangladeshi sculptor. The monument stood until the Bangladesh Liberation War in 1971, when it was demolished completely during Operation Searchlight. After Bangladesh gained independence, it was rebuilt. At present, all national, mourning, cultural and other activities held each year, regarding 21 February, have been centred around the Shaheed Minar.

=== Jatiyo Smriti Soudho ===
Jatiyo Sriti Shoudho or National Martyrs' Memorial is the national monument of Bangladesh is the symbol in the memory of the valour and the sacrifice of all those who gave their lives in the Bangladesh Liberation War of 1971.

=== Jatiya Sangshad ===
Jatiyo Sangsad Bhaban (National Parliament) building was created by American architect Louis Kahn. Construction was started in 1961 and completed on 28 January 1982 with the total cost was about 32 million dollars. It is situated at Shre-e-Bangla Nagar in Dhaka. Jatiyo Sangsad Bhaban was used for the first time on 15 February 1982 as the venue for the eighth (last) session of the second parliament of Bangladesh. Since then, it has been used for the Bangladesh National Assembly.

=== Tourist attractions in Dhaka ===
- Lalbagh Fort
- Dhakeshwari Temple
- Baitul Mukarram
- Ahsan Manzil
- Shaheed Minar
- Liberation War Museum
- Justice Shahabuddin Ahmed Park
- Jamuna Future Park
- Rickshaw art and rickshaw-riding
- Jatiyo Sangsad Bhaban
- Bashundhara City
- Kawran Bazaar
- Kemal Ataturk Avenue
- Ramna Park
- Bangladesh National Museum
- Nikli Haor

== Rangpur Division ==
=== Tajhat Palace ===
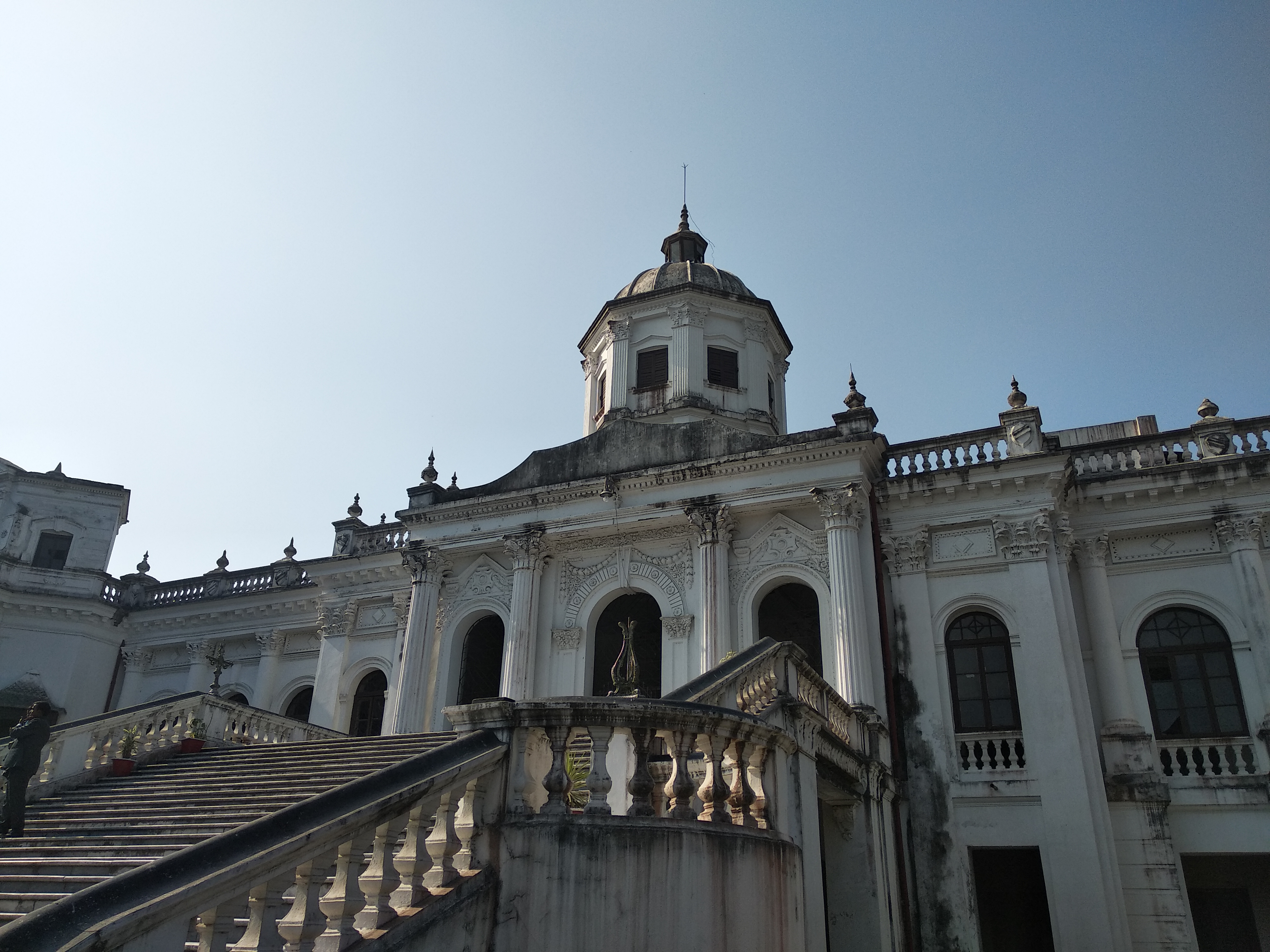
Tajhat Palace in Rangpur, Bangladesh

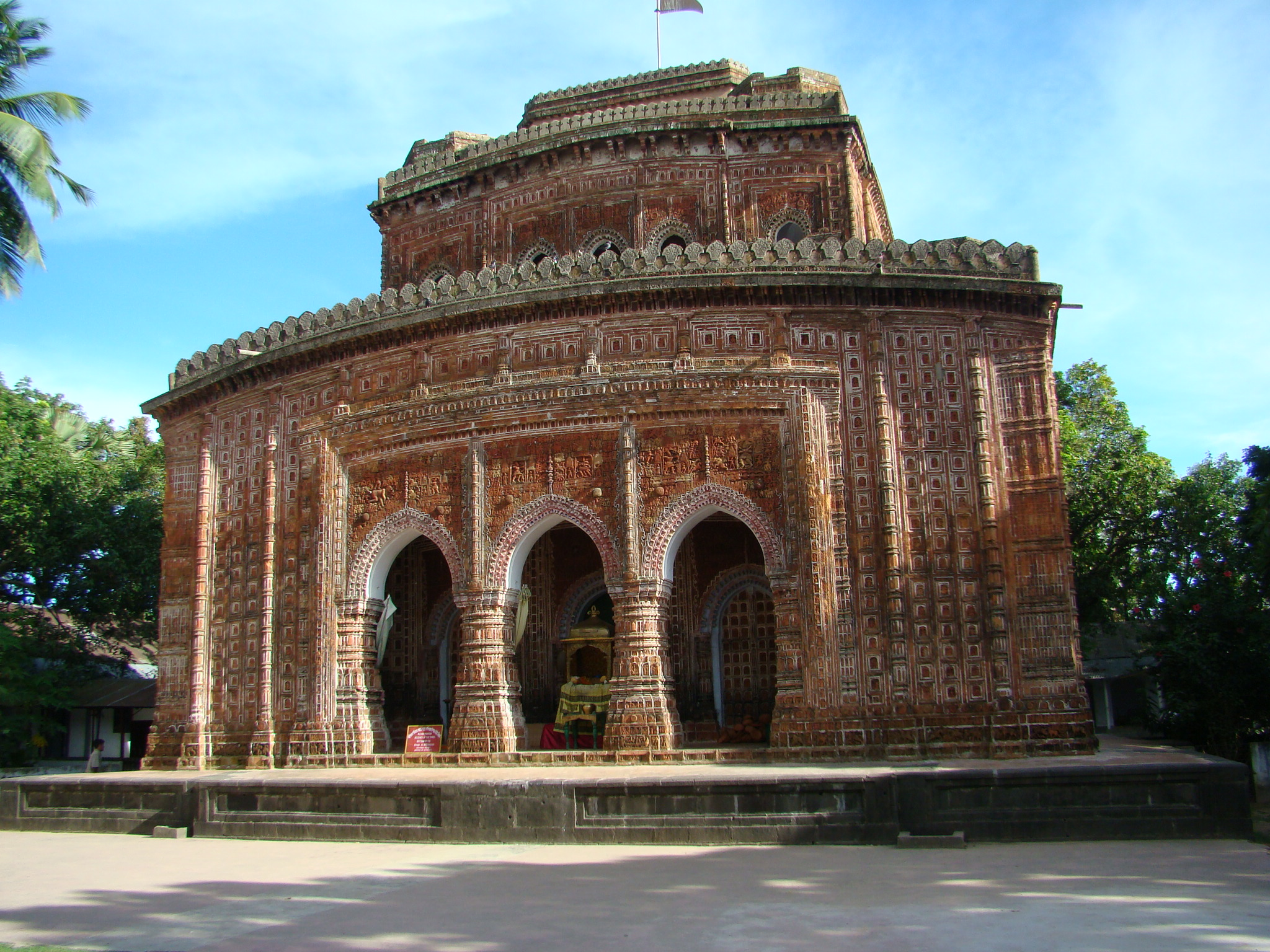
Kantaji Temple, A late-medieval Hindu temple in Dinajpur, Bangladesh. Built by Maharaja Pran Nath

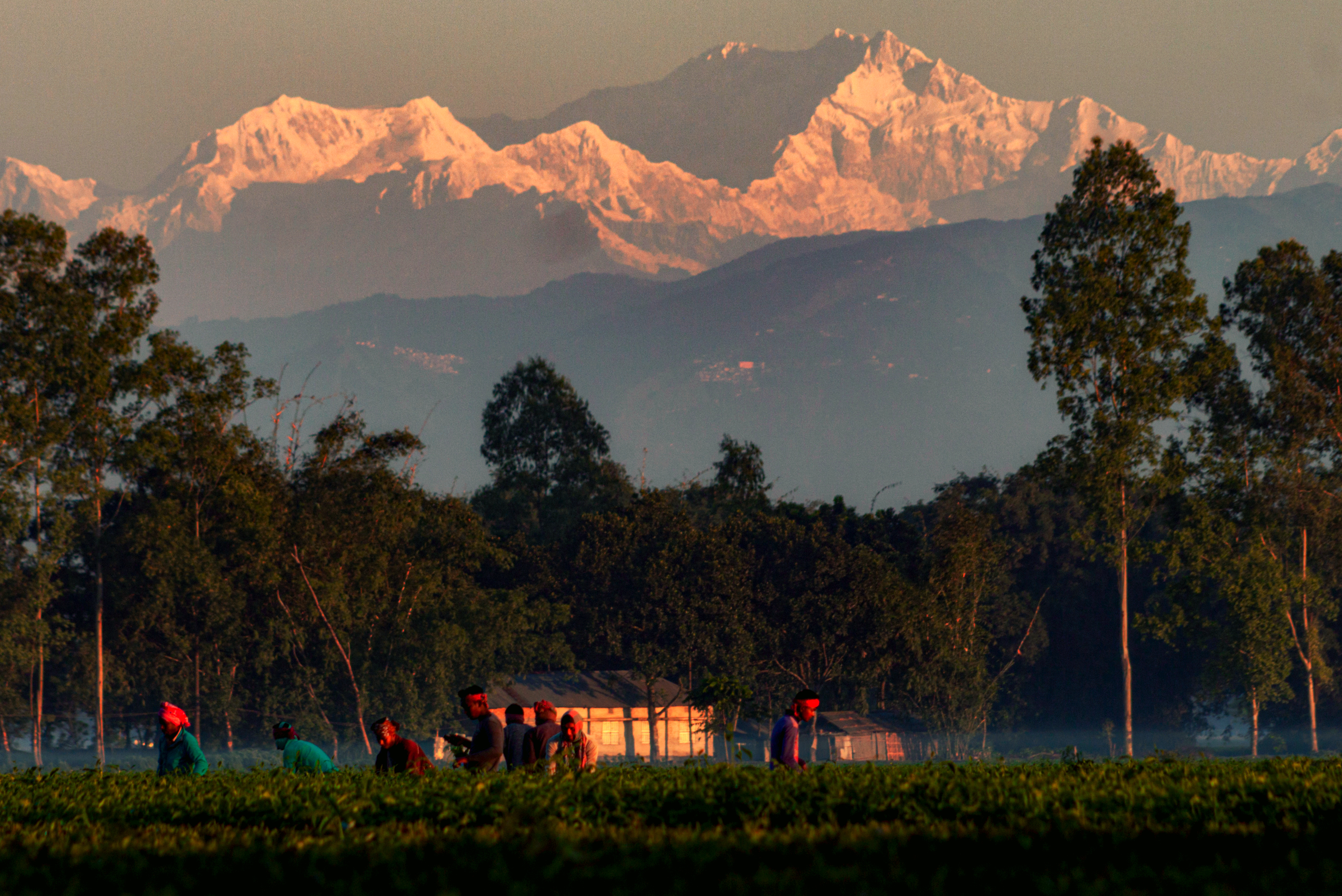
Kangchenjunga viewed from Tetulia, Panchagarh District, along with Tea Gardens.

Tajhat Palace is a magnificent European-style palace located at Tajhat, Vicinity of Rangpur. It is located about three kilometers south east of the city center. Built in the early 20th century, it now symbolizes the history and culture of northern Bangladesh. At present the Palace is used as Rangpur Divisional Museum.

=== Kantajew Temple ===
Kantajew Temple at Kantanagar, is a late-medieval Hindu temple in Dinajpur, Bangladesh. Built by Maharaja Pran Nath, its construction started in 1704 CE and ended in the reign of his son Raja Ramnath 1722 CE. It is an example of Terracotta architecture and once had nine spires, but all were destroyed during the 1897 Assam earthquake.

=== Autumn tourism in Panchagarh ===
The Panchagarh District, the northernmost District in Bangladesh, is famous for its tea plantations of the plainland. In addition with that, in the Autumn, the skyline of this region includes Kangchenjunga, the world's third highest mountain peak for a short span of time before Winter. Therefore, Domestic tourist gathers from different parts of the country in autumn season (October- November) to see the views of the Himalayas and tea gardens.

=== Dinajpur District ===
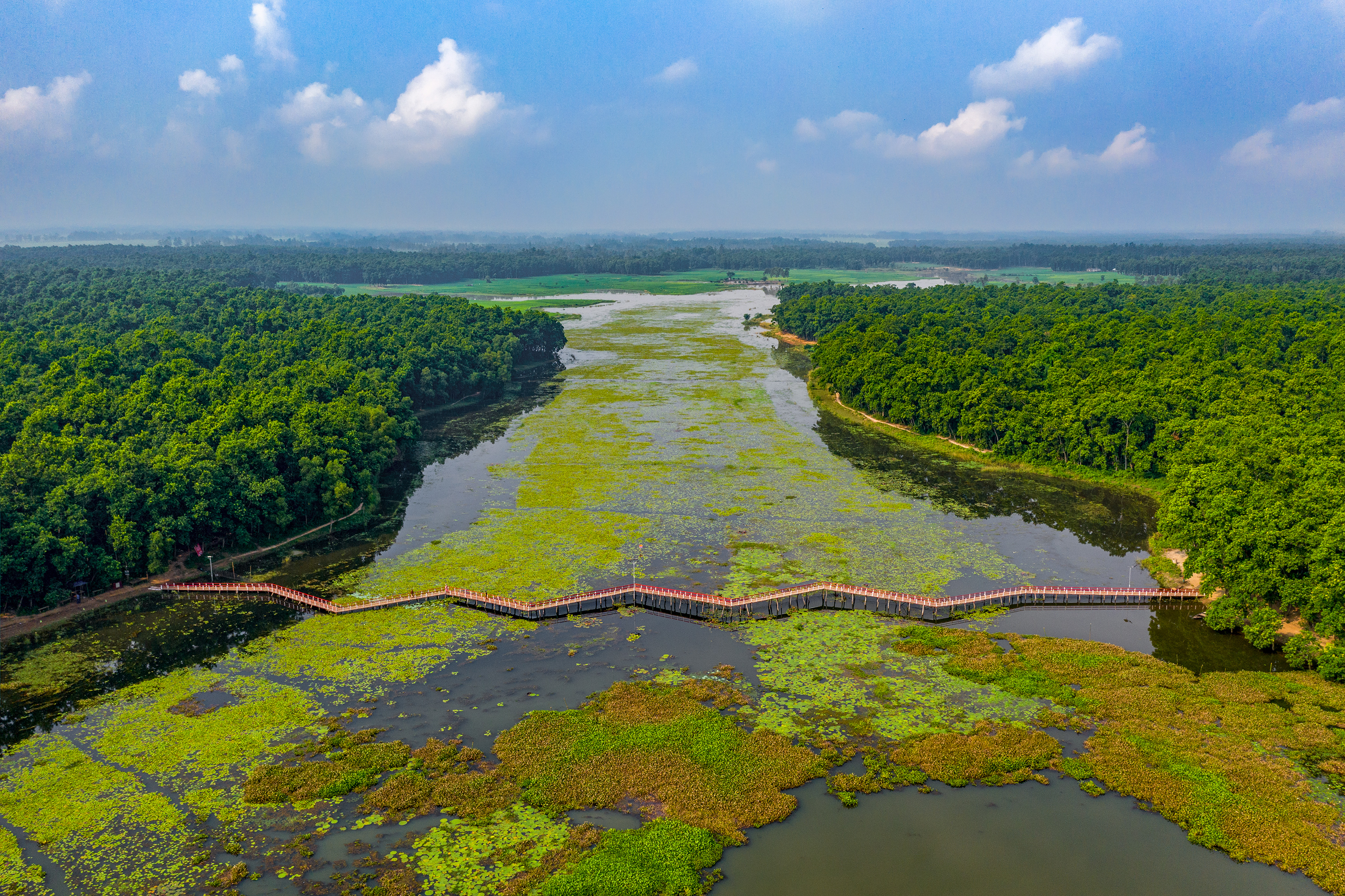
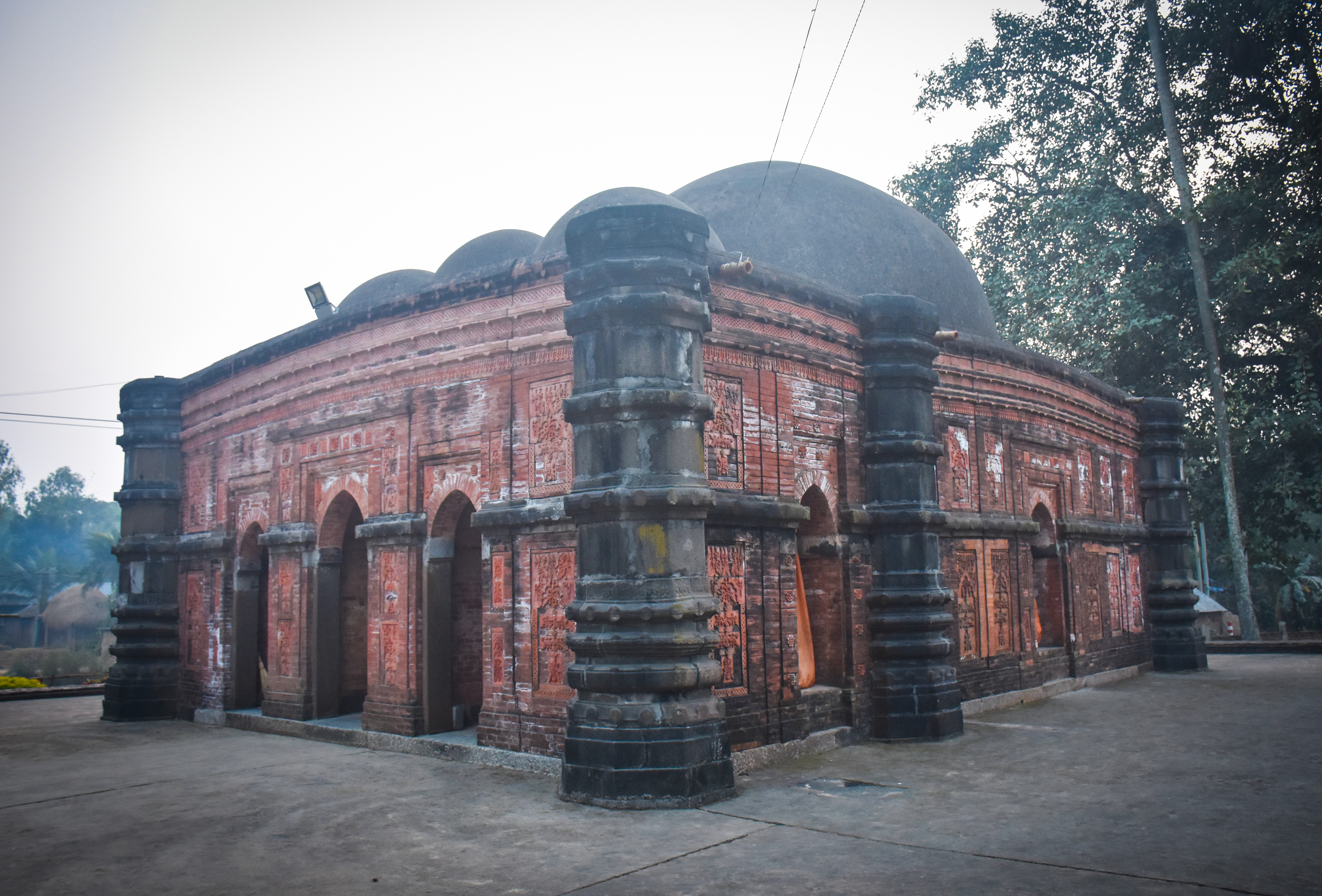
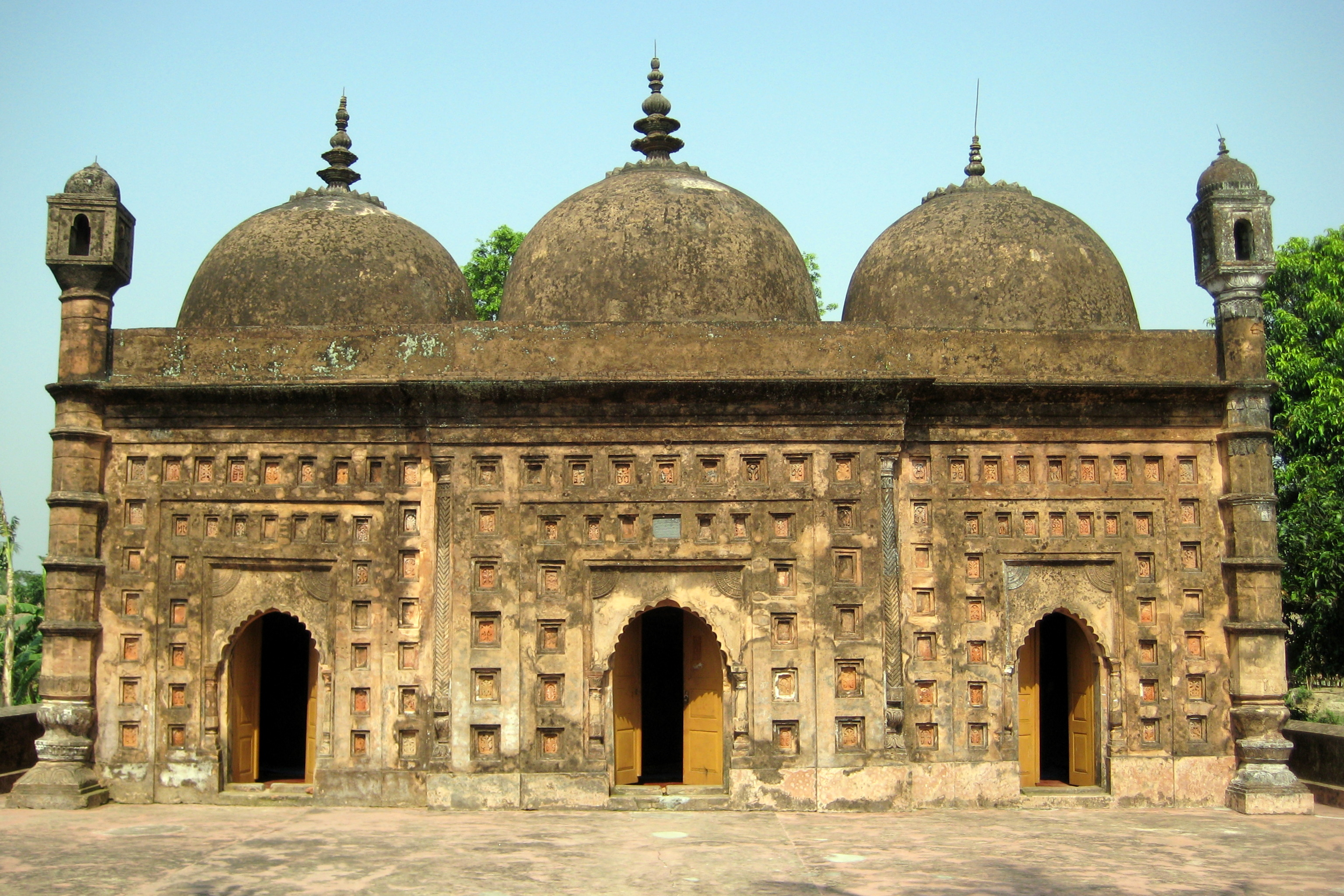
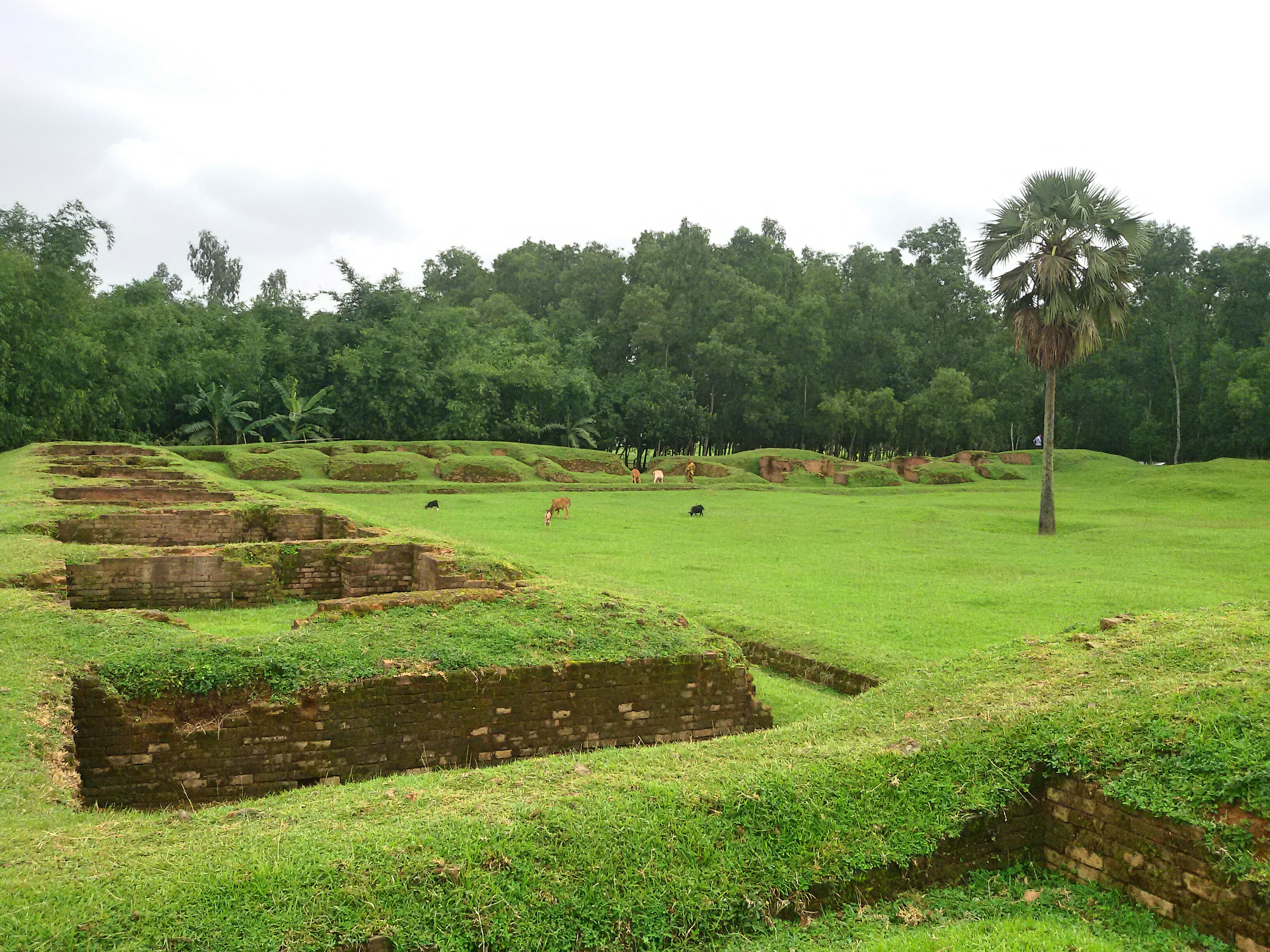
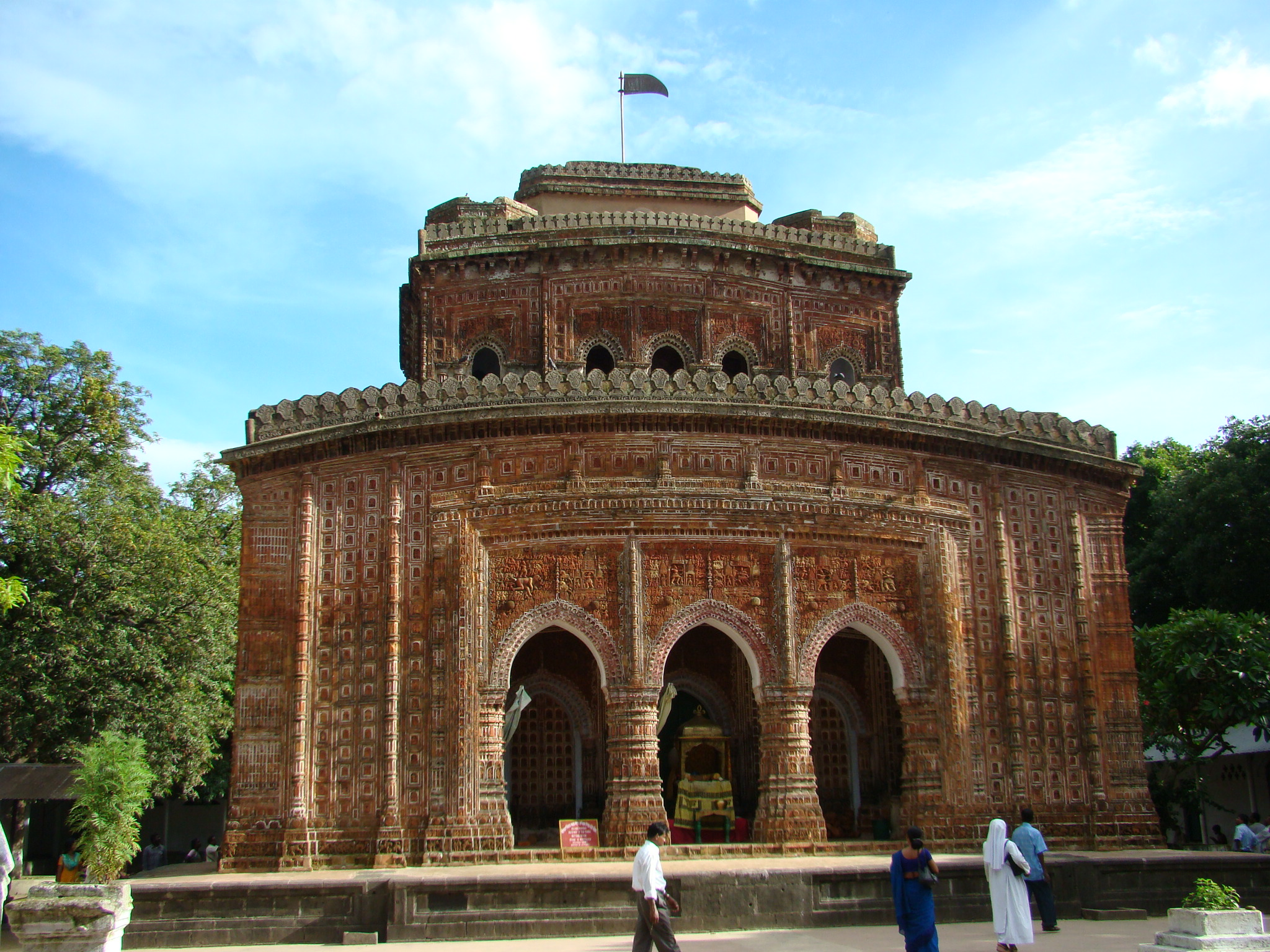
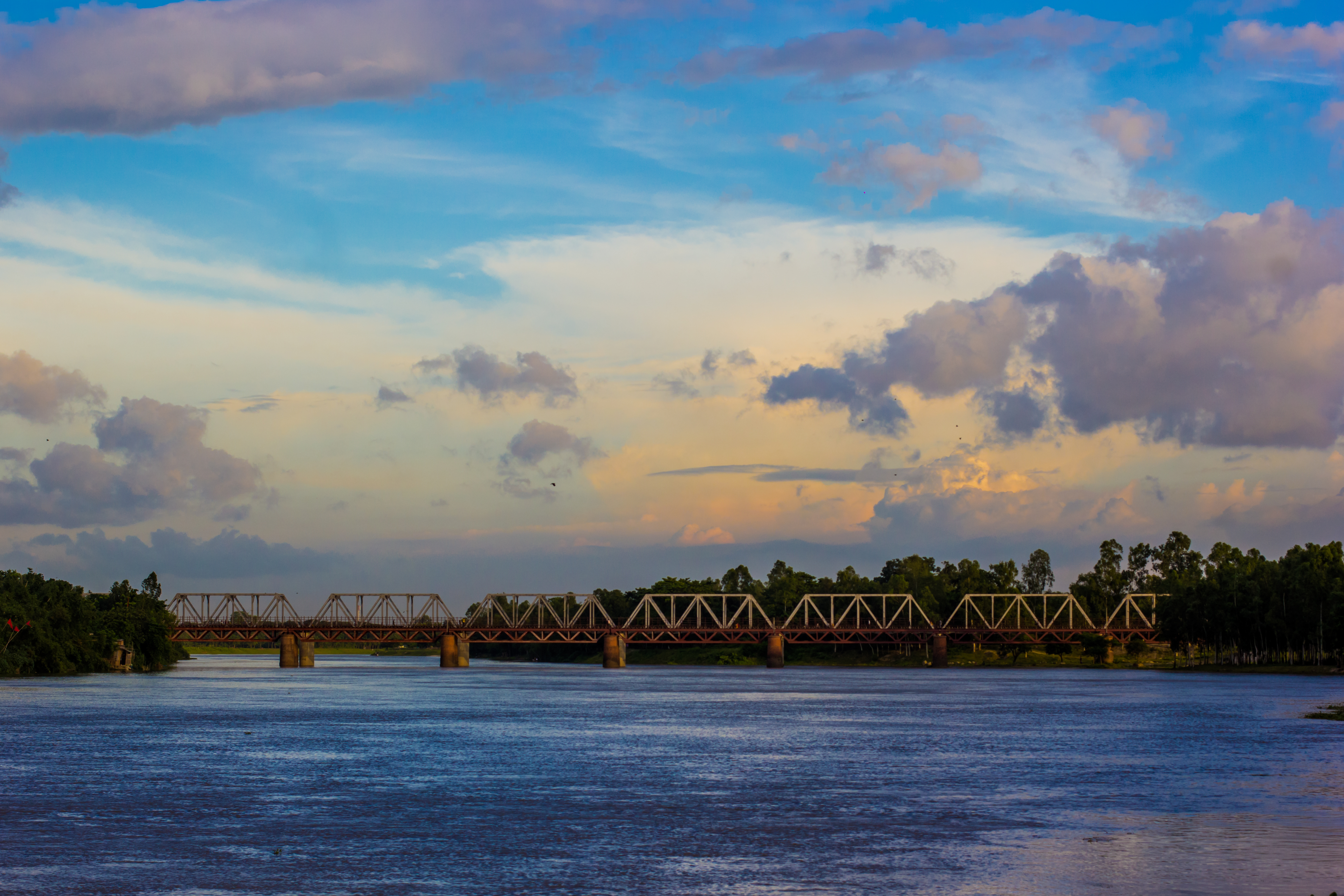
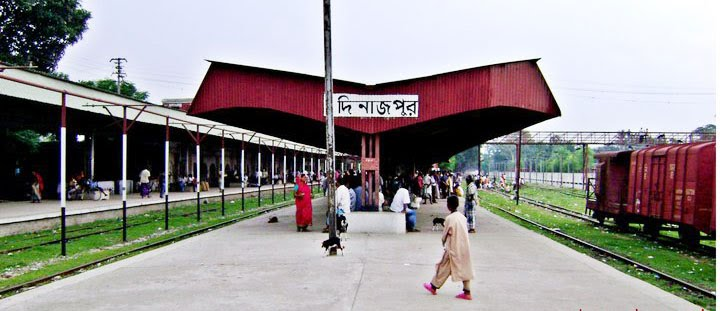

Serially from top: Nawabganj National Park, Sura Mosque, Nayabad Mosque, Sitakot Vihara, Kantajew Temple

== Rajshahi Division ==
=== Somapura Mahavihara ===
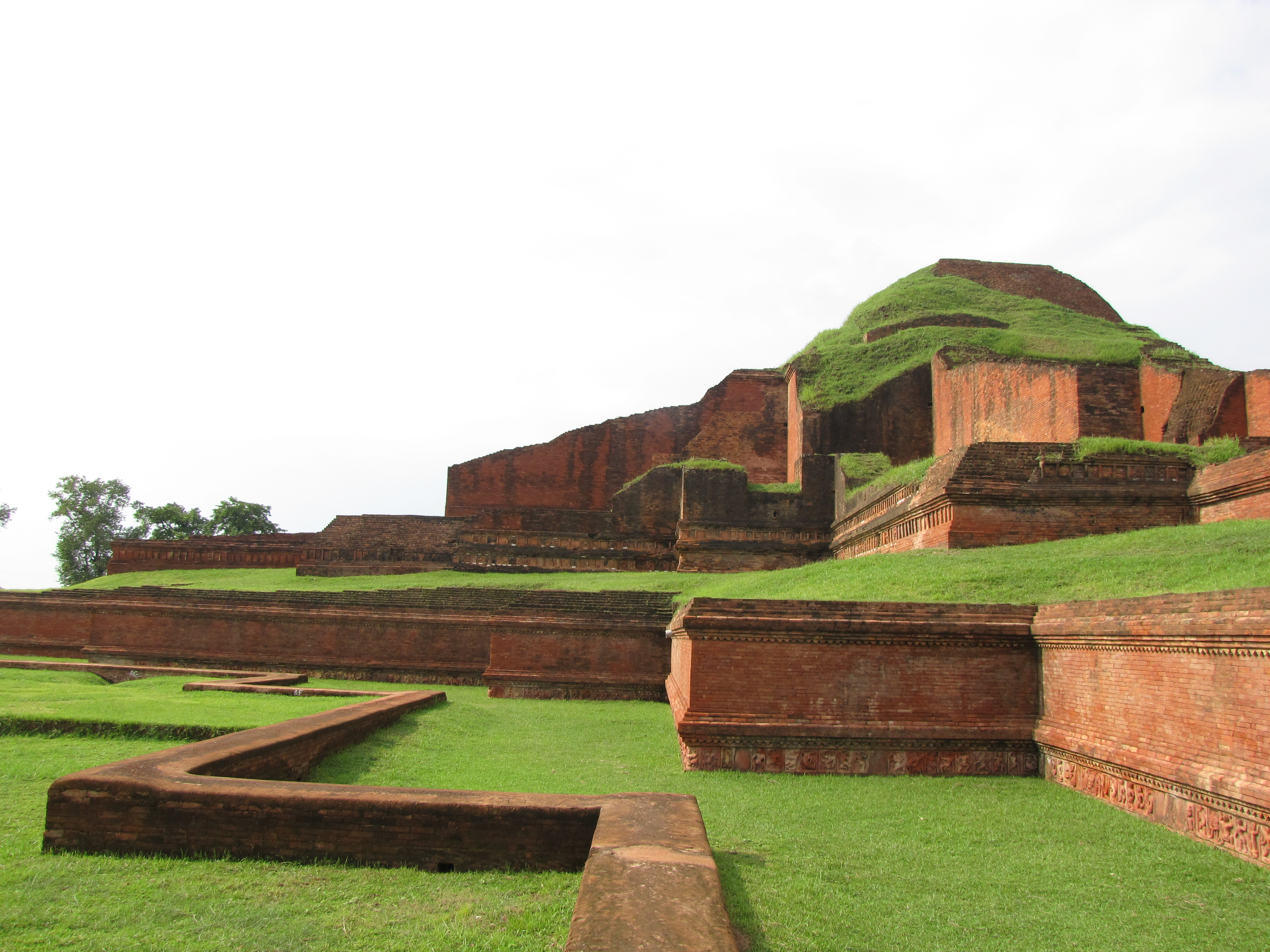
Somapura Mahavihara is a World Heritage Site.

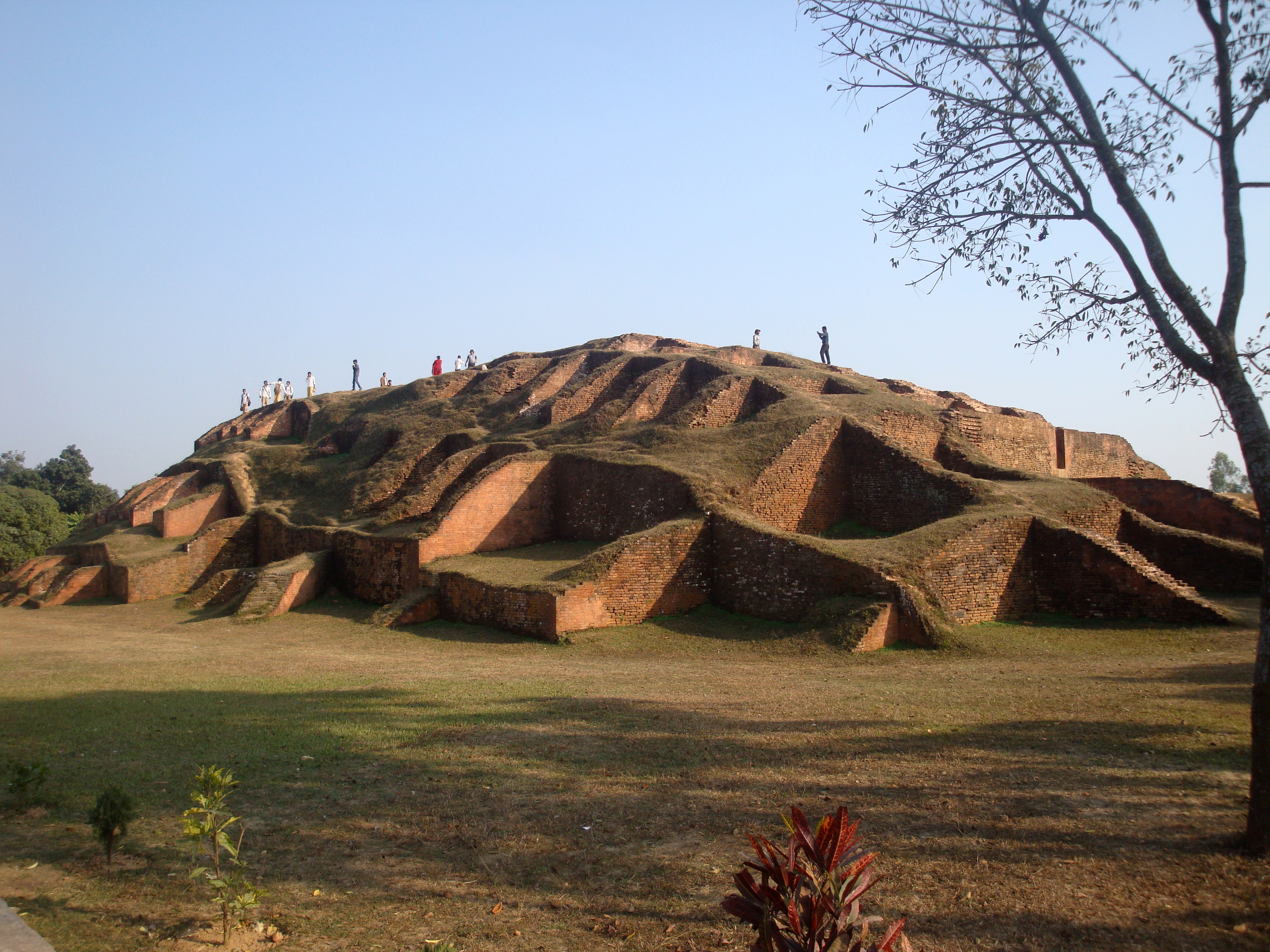
Behula Lakhindar Basor Ghor at Bogra

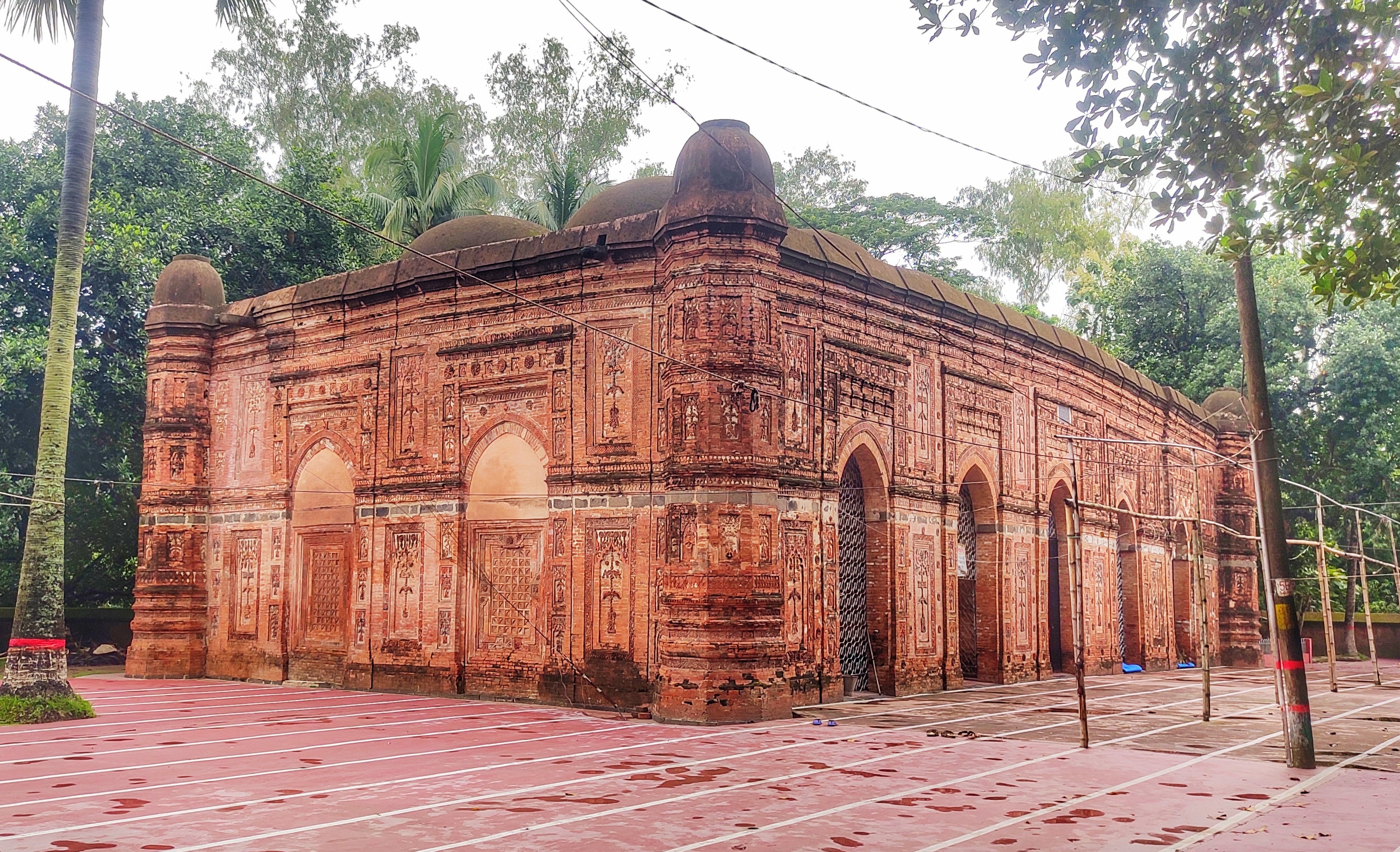
Bagha Mosque

Somapura Mahavihara in Paharpur, Badalgachhi Upazila, Naogaon District (25°1'51.83"N, 88°58'37.15"E) is among the best known Buddhist viharas in the Indian subcontinent and is one of the most important archaeological sites in the country. It was designated a UNESCO World Heritage Site in 1985.

=== Mahastangar ===
Mahasthangarh is the earliest urban archaeological sites so far discovered in Bangladesh. The village Mahasthan in Shibganj thana of Bogra District contains the remains of an ancient city which was called Pundranagara or Paundravardhanapura in the territory of Pundravardhana. A limestone slab bearing six lines in Prakrit in Brahmi script, discovered in 1931, dates Mahasthangarh to at least the 3rd century BC. The fortified area was in use until the 18th century AD.

=== Behula Lakshindar Basor Ghor ===
Behula is the protagonist in the Manasamangal genre of Bengali medieval epics. A number of works belonging to this genre were written between the thirteenth and eighteenth centuries. Though the religious purpose of these works is to eulogise the Hindu goddess Manasa, these works are more well known for depicting the love story of Behula and her husband Lakhindar.

=== Varendra Research Museum ===
Varendra Museum is a museum, research centre and visitor attraction in Rajshahi town and maintained by the University of Rajshahi.

=== Bagha Mosque ===
According to an inscription found over the mosque's central entrance, Bagha Mosque was built by Sultan Nusrat Shah in 1523. The inscription is now preserved in Karachi, Pakistan. The mosque is a richly decorated monument built of bricks with stone plinth, lintels and pillars. It is roofed over with ten domes. They collapsed in the earthquake of 1897, but were rebuilt to their original form in 1978 by the Department of Archaeology (Bangladesh).

== Barisal Division ==
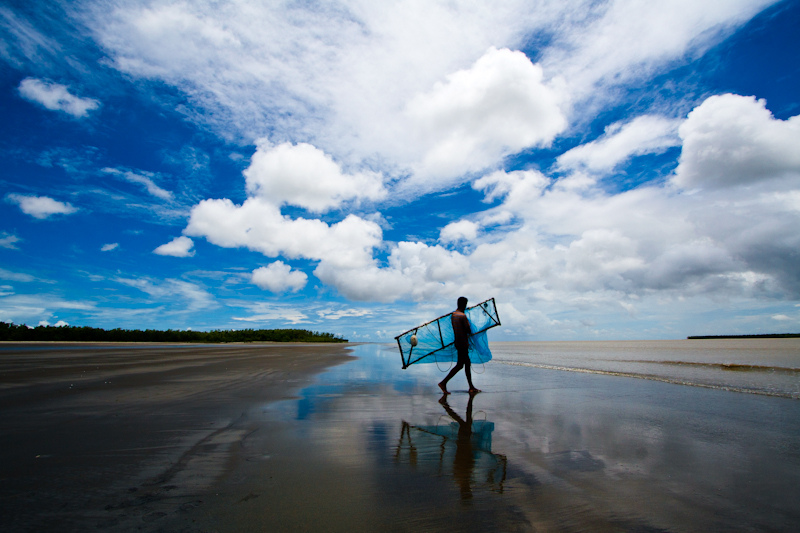
Kuakata beach

=== Kuakata Beach ===
Kuakata is a sea beach on the southernmost tip of Bangladesh. Located in Patuakhali District, Kuakata has a wide sandy beach about 320 kilometres (200 mi) south of Dhaka, and about 70 kilometres (43 mi) from the district headquarters. Kuakata beach is 30 kilometres (19 mi) long and 6 kilometres (3.7 mi) wide. On the eastern end of the beach is Gongamati Reserved Forest, an evergreen mangrove forest and snippet of the original Kuakata. When the Rakhines settled in the area in 1784, Kuakata was part of the larger Sundarbans forest. Sundarbans is now at a distance of one-hour by speed boat. As a mangrove forest, Gongamati, like the Sundarbans, offers some protection against tidal surges, however it too is threatened by logging and deforestation. The forest can be reached by foot or bike along the beach.

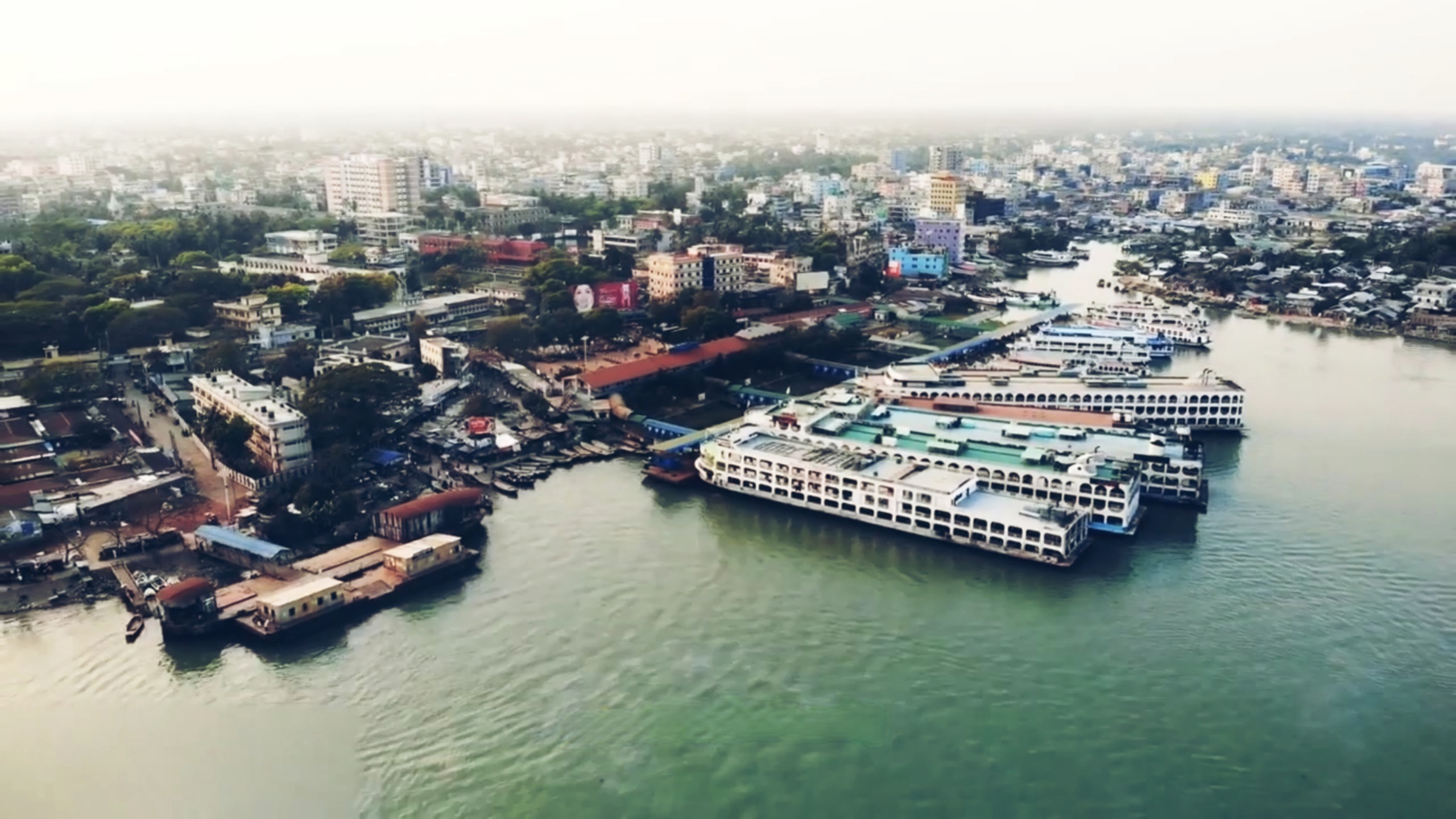
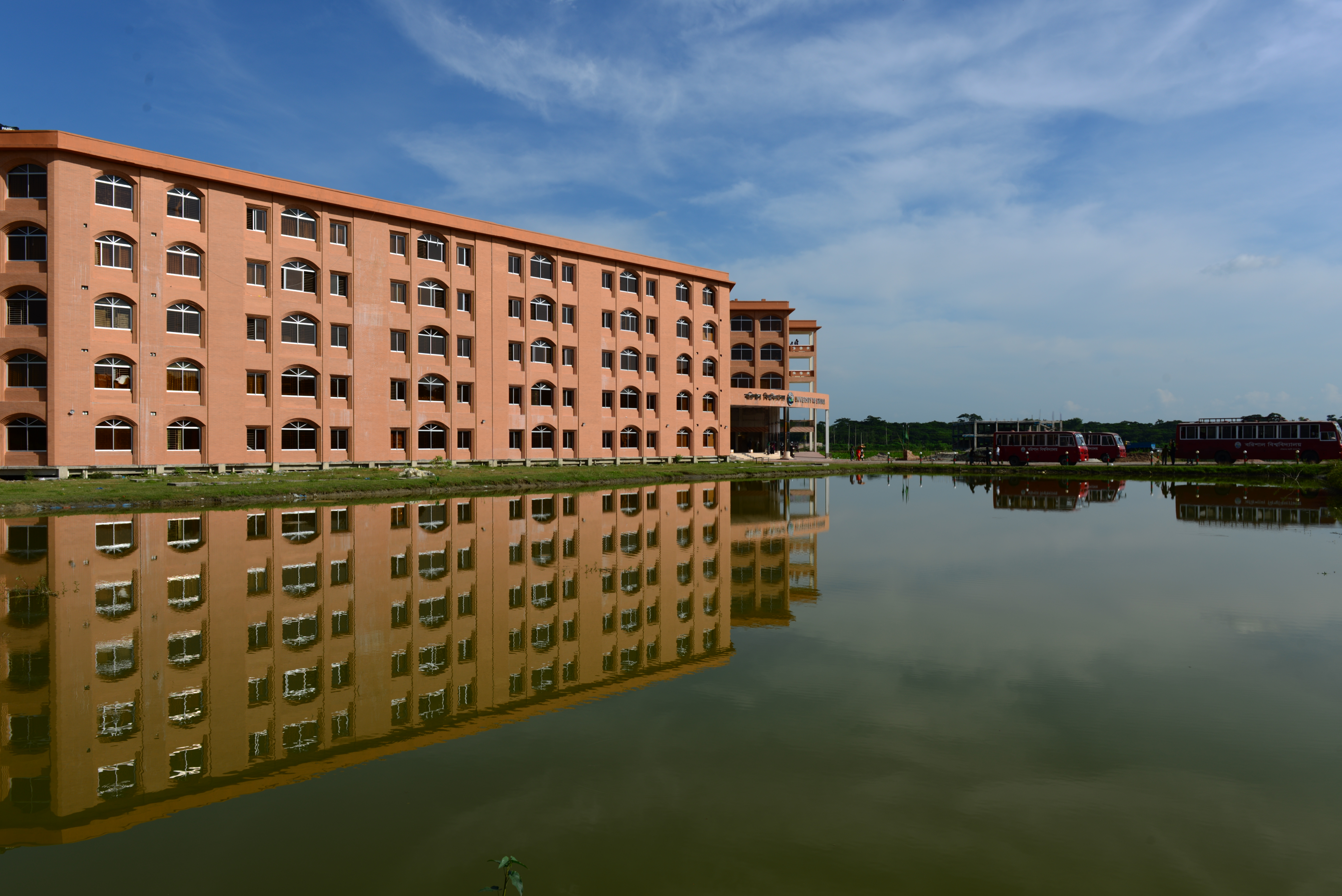
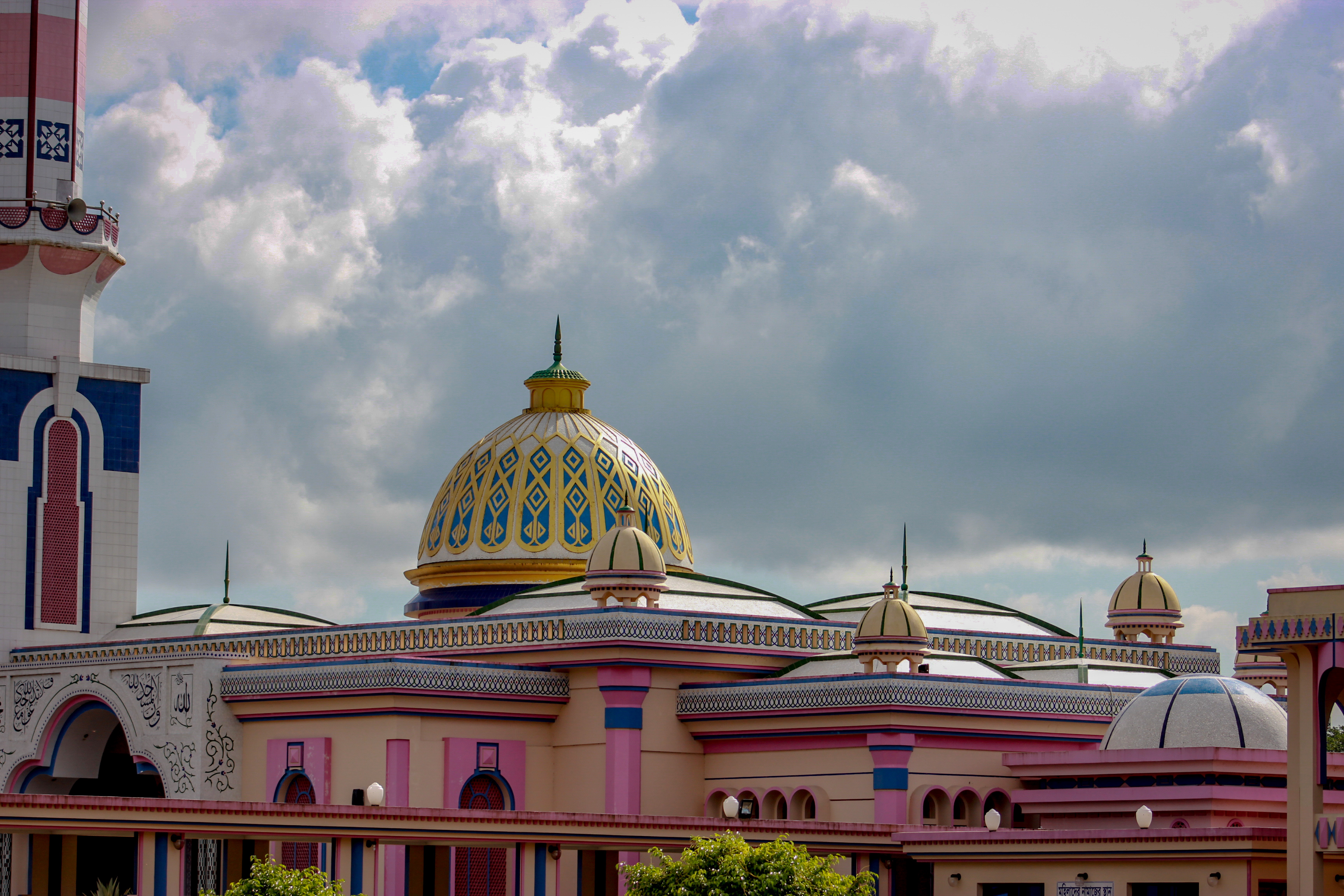
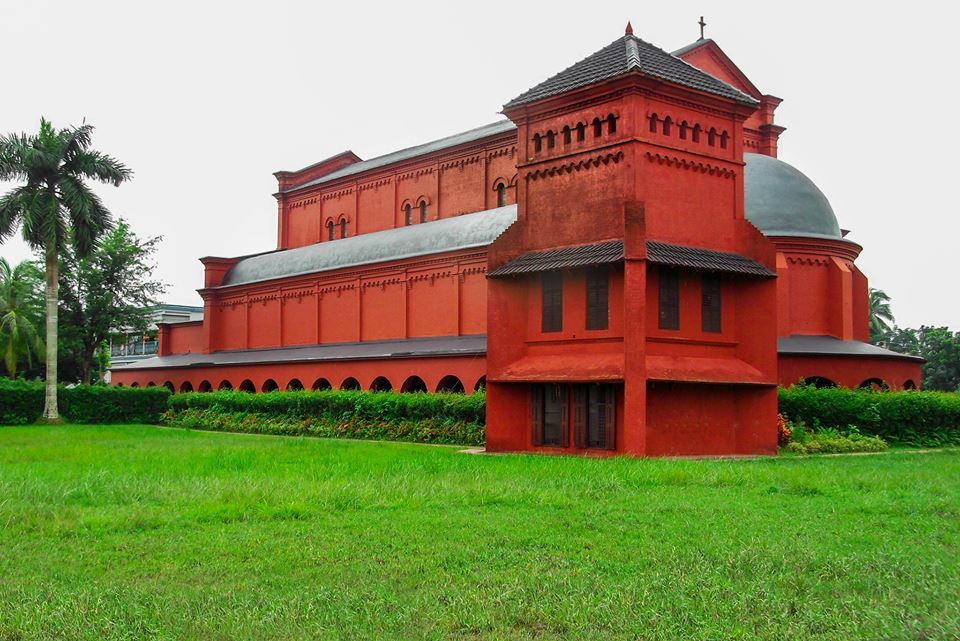
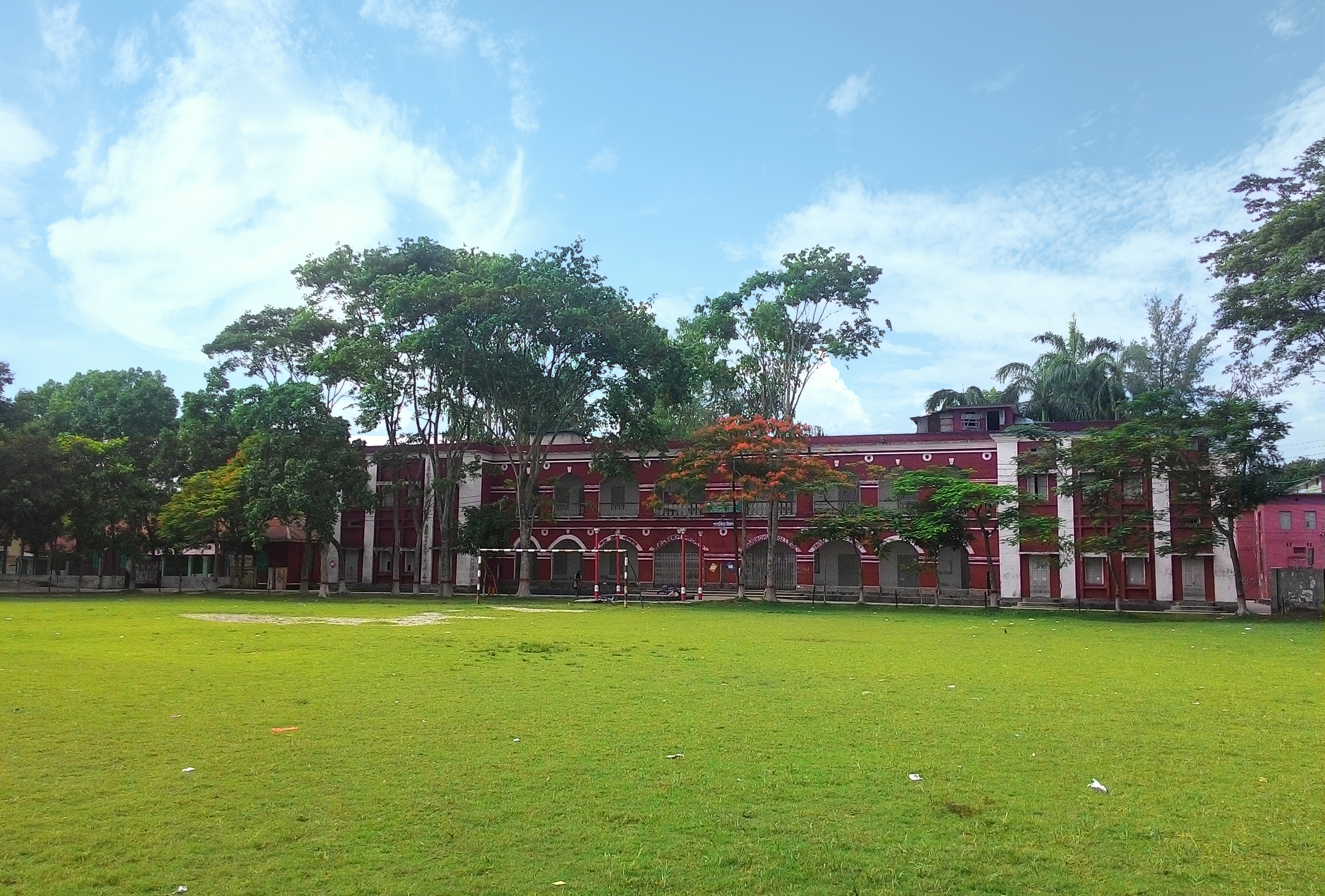
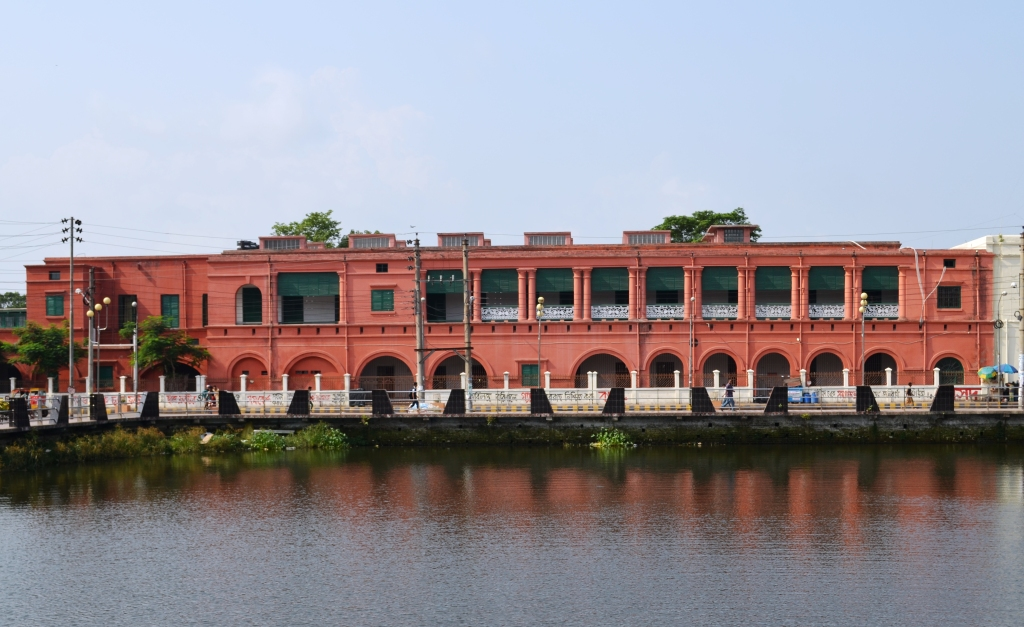
From top: Barisal Launch Terminal,
University of Barisal, Guthia Mosque,
Oxford Mission Church,
Brojomohun College, Barisal Museum

== Khulna Division ==
=== Sundarbans ===
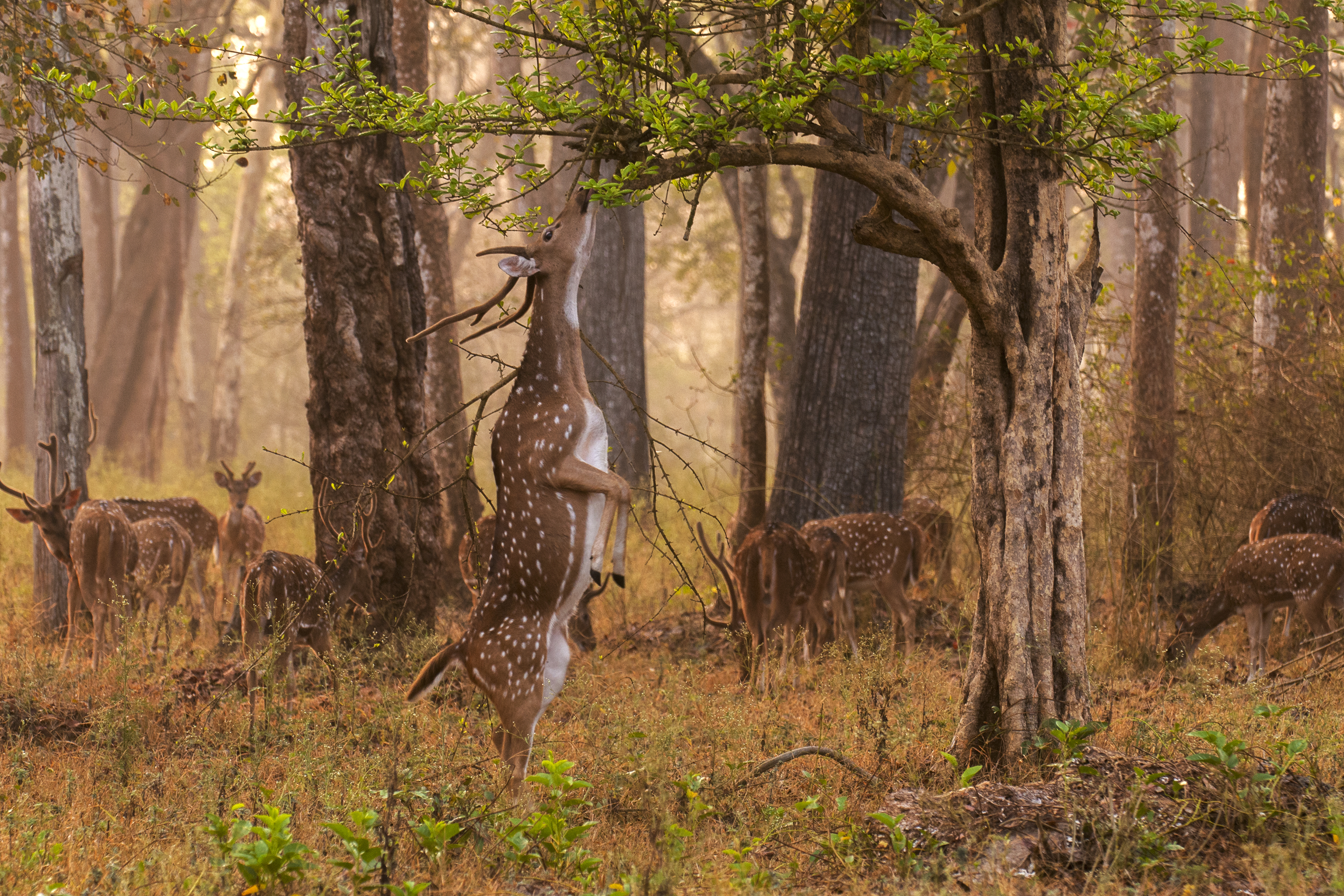
Chital deer are widely seen in Sundarbans

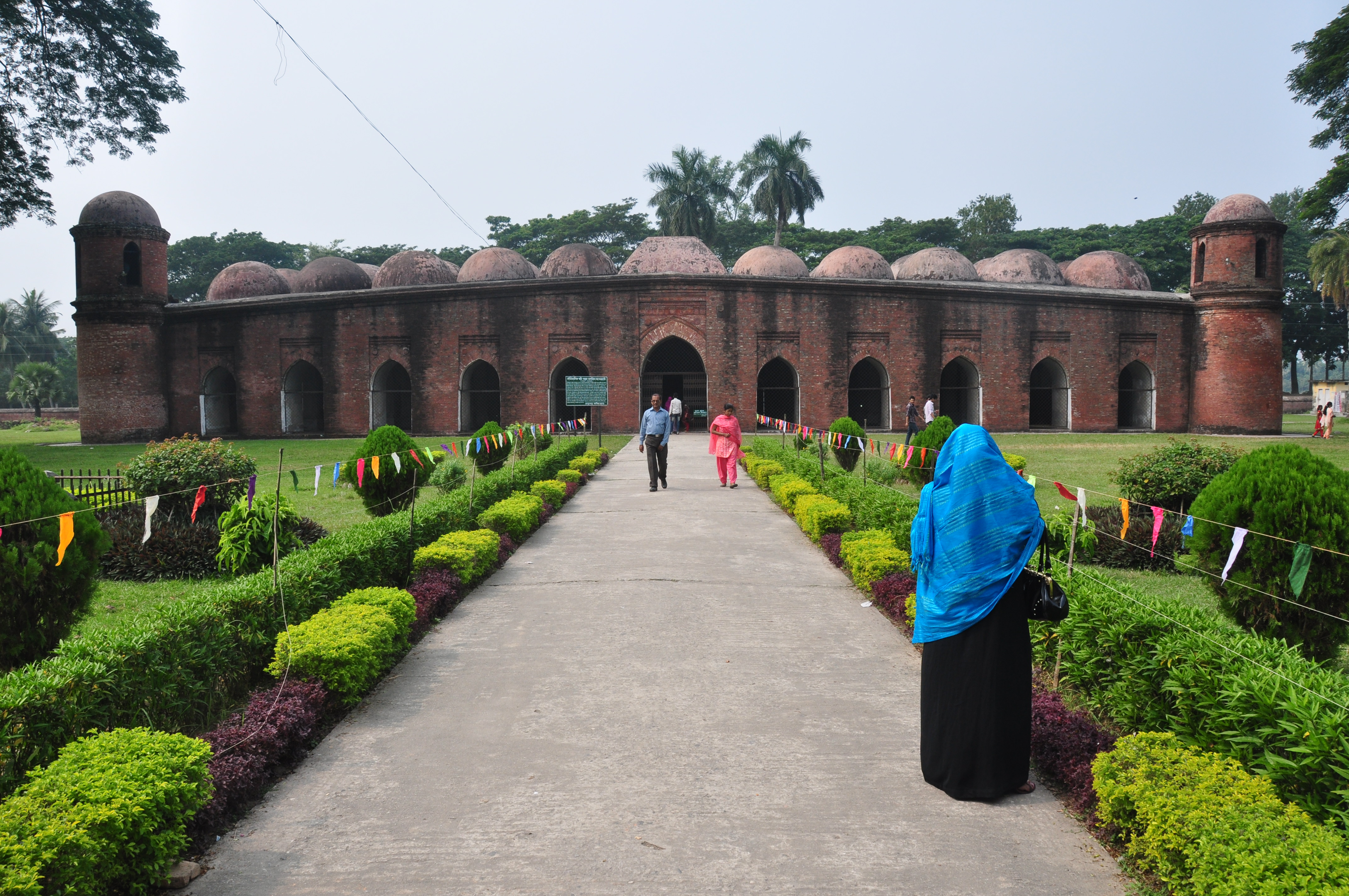
Sixty Dome Mosque in Bagerhat Bangladesh

The Sundarbans is the largest single block of tidal halophytic mangrove forest in the world. The Sunderbans is a UNESCO World Heritage Site, most of which is situated in Bangladesh with the remainder in India. Sundarbans South, East and West are three protected forests in Bangladesh. This region is densely covered by mangrove forests, and is one of the largest reserves for the Bengal tiger.

=== Mosque City of Bagerhat ===
The Mosque City of Bagerhat is located in the suburbs of Bagerhat city in Bagerhat District, in the Khulna Division of southwest of Bangladesh. Bagerhat is about 24 kilometres (15 mi) southeast of Khulna and 320 km (200 mi) southwest of Dhaka.

Originally known as Khalifatabad and nicknamed the "mint town of the Bengal Sultanate", the city was founded in the 15th century by the warrior saint Turkish general Ulugh Khan Jahan.

The historic city has more than 50 Islamic monuments which have been found after removing the vegetation that had obscured them from view for many centuries. The site has been recognised as a UNESCO World Heritage Site in 1983 under criteria (iv), "as an outstanding example of an architectural ensemble which illustrates a significant stage in human history", of which the Sixty Pillar Mosque (Shat Gombuj Masjid in Bengali), constructed with 60 pillars and 77 domes, is the most well known. Apart from these monuments, UNESCO also includes the mausoleum of Khan Jahan, the mosques of Singar, Bibi Begni, Reza Khoda, Zindavir among the unique monuments.

== Architecture ==
=== Religious ===
Bangladesh has many places of worship. Capital Dhaka is known as the city of mosques.

Some famous Religious Places of Worship and visitor attractions are:

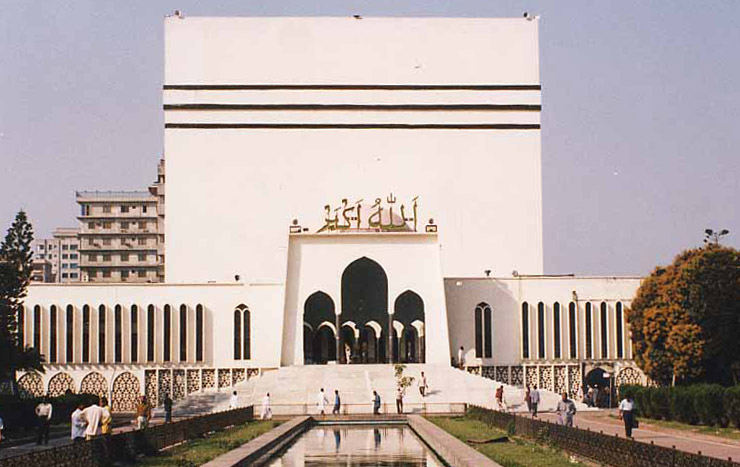
The structure of Baitul Mukarram resembles the Kaaba in Mecca

- Baitul Mukarram is the national mosque of Bangladesh. Located at the centre of Dhaka, the mosque was completed in 1968. The mosque has a capacity of 30,000, and it is world's tenth largest mosque.

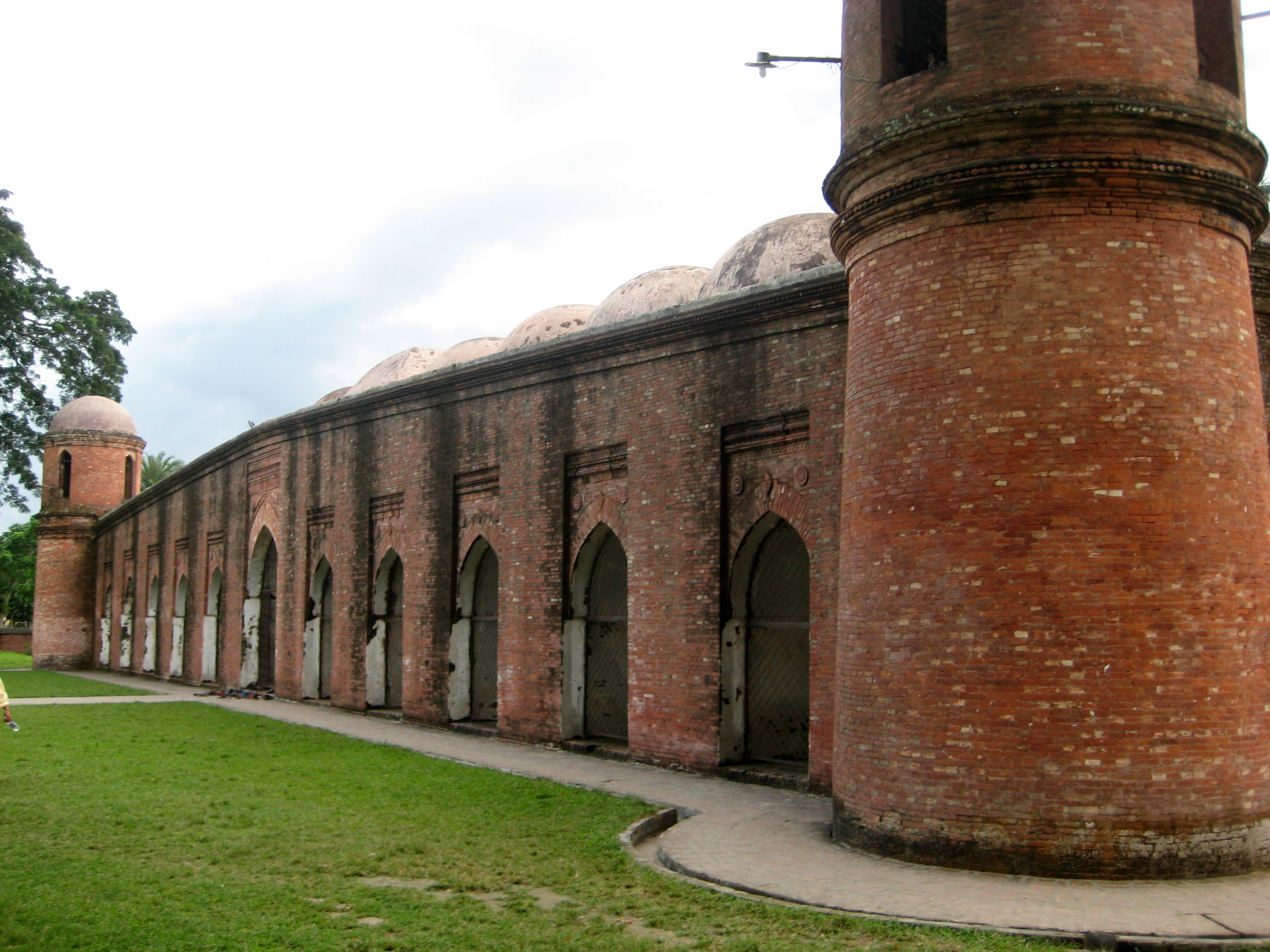
Shat Gombuj Mosque (Sixty Dome Mosque) in Bagerhat Mosque City

- Mosque City of Bagerhat is a formerly lost city, located in the suburbs of Bagerhat city in Bagerhat District, in the Khulna Division. The historic city, listed by Forbes as one of the 15 lost cities of the world, has more than 50 Islamic monuments.

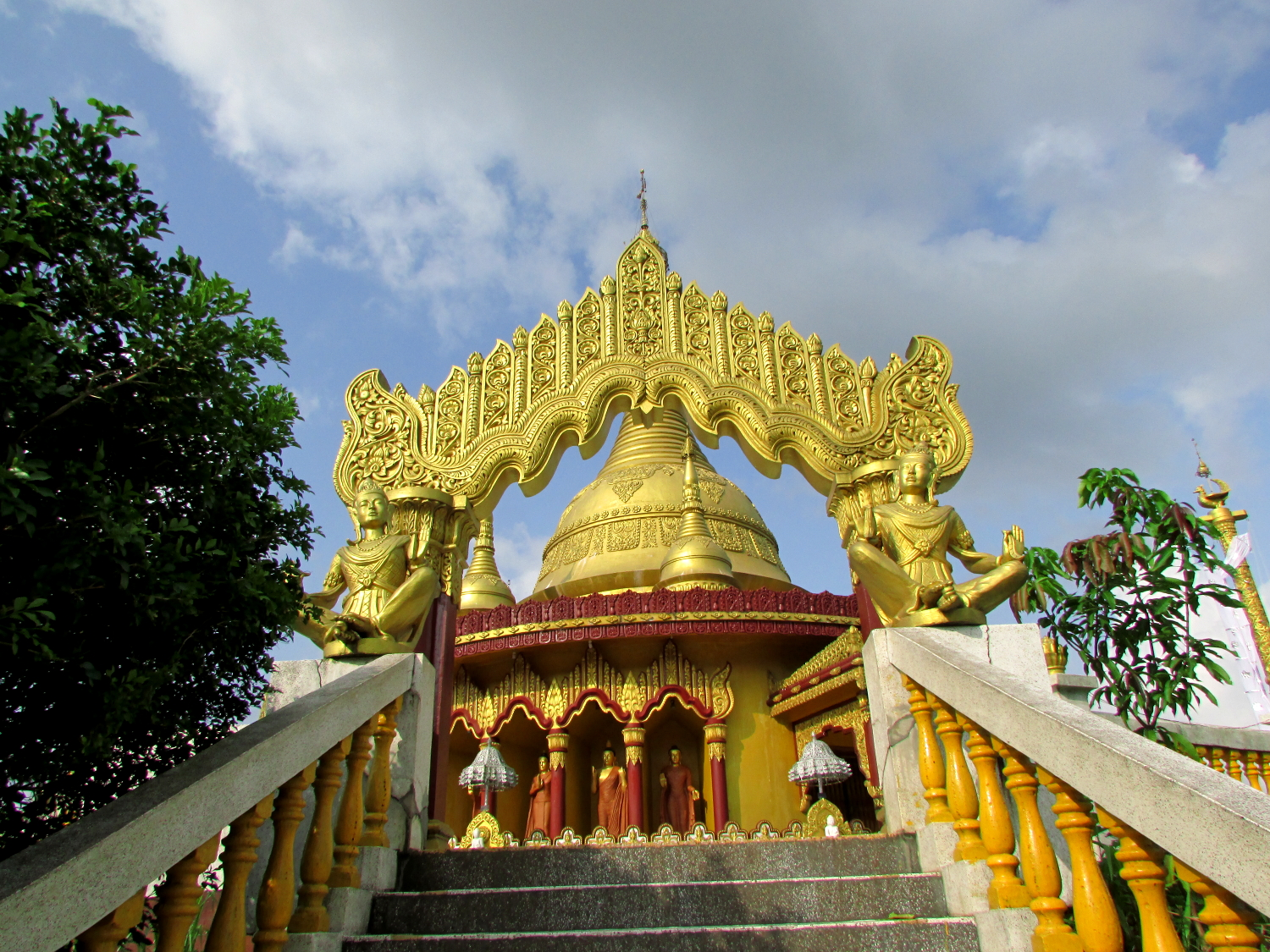
Bandarban Golden Temple at Bandarban, a holy place for the Buddhists

- Bandarban Golden Temple is the largest Theravada Buddhist temple in Bangladesh and has the second-largest Buddha statue in the country. The temple located in Bandarban City.

- Kantajew Temple built between 1702 and 1752, a nava-ratna (nine-spired) style Hindu temple.
- Dhakeshwari Temple built in the twelfth century, the national temple of Bangladesh.
- Hoseni Dalan a Shia shrine built in the seventeenth century.
- Sixty Dome Mosque is a mosque in Bangladesh, the largest in that country from the Sultanate period. It has been described as "the most impressive Muslim monuments in the whole of the Indian subcontinent."

=== Ancient ruins ===
- Wari-Bateshwar ruins, built in 450 BC, 2500-year-old ancient fort city
- Somapura Mahavihara is a Buddhist monastery situated in the Rajshahi District in the north of Bangladesh. Covering almost 27 acres of land, Somapura Mahavira is one of the largest monasteries south of the Himalayas. The design is considered to be greatly influenced by Buddhist architecture found in Java and Cambodia.
- Mainamati is an isolated ridge of low hills in the eastern margins of deltaic Bangladesh, about 8 kilometres (5.0 mi) to the west of Comilla town. A landmark of ancient history, it represents a small mass of quasi-lateritic old alluvium. The ridge, set in the vast expanse of the fertile lower Meghna basin, extends for about 17 kilometres (11 mi) north–south from Mainamati village on the Gumti River to Chandi Mura near the Lalmai railway station.

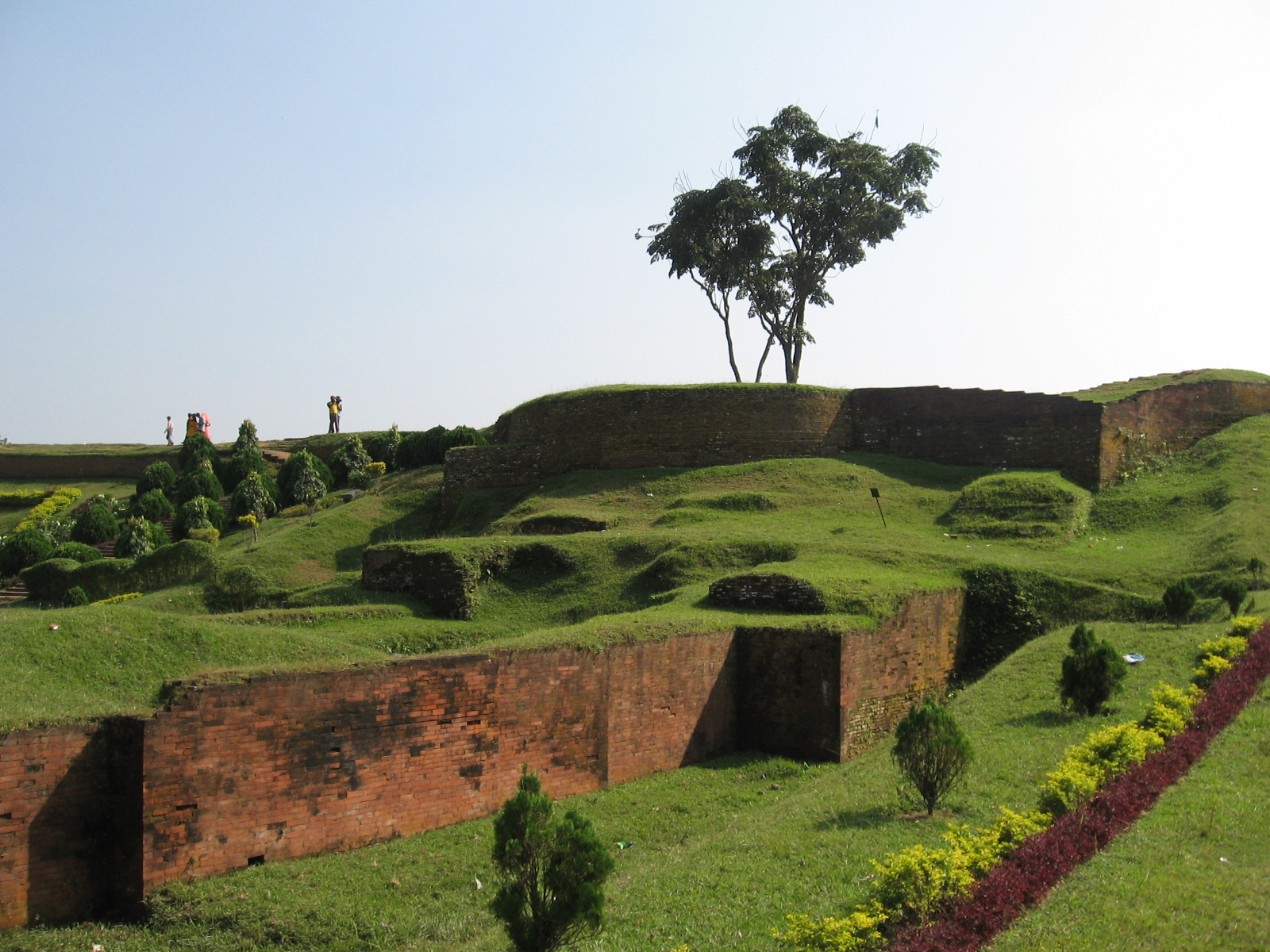
Mahasthangarh at Bogra

- The oldest archaeological site in Bangladesh is outside Bogra, at Mahasthangarh.

=== Middle Age ===
- Sonargaon was the administrative centre of medieval Muslim rulers in East Bengal.
- Lalbagh Fort Lalbagh Fort or Fort Aurangabad, an incomplete Mughal palace fortress at Dhaka on the river Buriganga in the southwestern part of the old city. The fort was considered to be a combination of three buildings (the mosque, the tomb of Bibi Pari and the Diwan-i-Aam), two gateways and a portion of the partly damaged fortification wall.
- Ahsan Manzil was previously the official palace of the Dhaka Nawab family and is currently a museum preserving the culture and history of the area. Ahsan Manzil is considered to be one of the most noteworthy architectural monuments in Bangladesh.
- Bara Katra an architectural relic of Dhaka city. It is situated to the south of Chawk Bazar close to the bank of the river buriganga. The Katra enclosed a quadrangular courtyard with 22 rooms on all of its four sides.

=== British architecture ===
- Curzon Hall a hundred years old British style town hall.
- Northbrook Hall a hundred and fifty years old British style town hall.

=== Modern ===
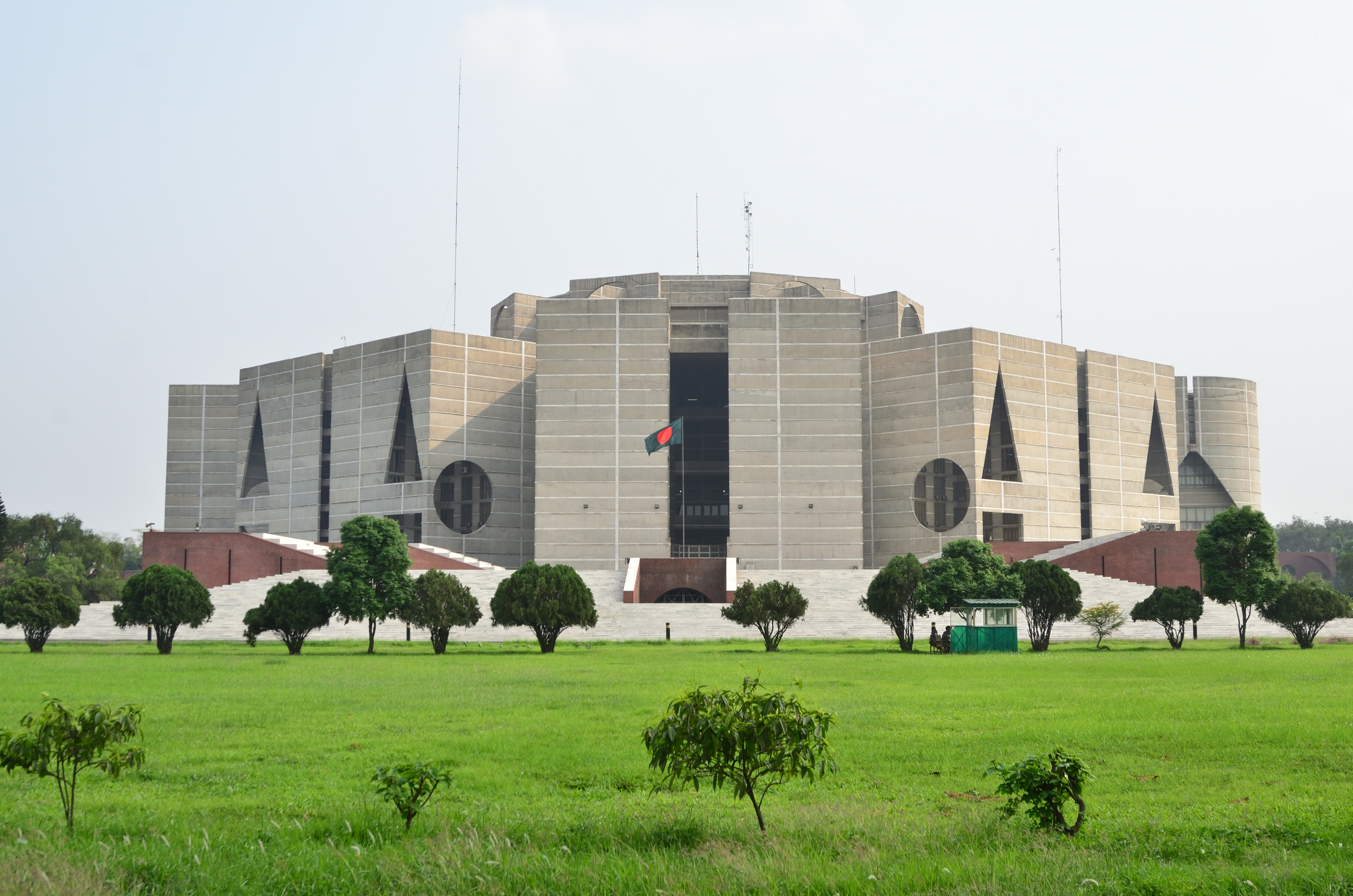
View of Jatiyo Sangsad Bhaban

- Bangladesh National Museum Located in the suburb of Shahbag, in the city of Dhaka, is the biggest museum in Bangladesh. It has a collection of over eighty five thousand pieces. The four-storey building is home not only to large exhibition halls, but to a conservatory laboratory, library, three auditoriums, photographic gallery, temporary exhibition hall, and an audio-visual division.
- Jatiyo Sangshad Bhaban Parliamentary Building of Bangladesh, located in Dhaka. It was created by architect Louis Kahn and is one of the largest legislative complexes in the world. It houses all parliamentary activities of Bangladesh.
- Taj Mahal Bangladesh is a Bangladeshi architecture inspired from original Taj Mahal.

== Historic monuments ==
- Greek Memorial is an ancient monument, built in around AD 1900, looks like ancient Greek temples, a small yellow structure on land owned by the Greek Community, which flourished in Dhaka in the 19th century.
- National Martyrs' Memorial is the national monument for the Bangladesh Liberation War of 1971
- Martyred Intellectuals Memorial is a memorial built in memory of the martyred intellectuals of the Bangladesh Liberation War.
- Suhrawardy Udyan formerly known as Ramna Race Course ground is a national memorial located in Dhaka. It is named after Huseyn Shaheed Suhrawardy.
- Mosque City of Bagerhat is a formerly lost city, located in the suburbs of Bagerhat city in Bagerhat District, in the Khulna Division of southwest of Bangladesh and UNESCO World Heritage Site.
- Ahsan Manzil was the official residential palace and seat of the Dhaka Nawab Family. This building is situated at Kumartoli along the banks of the Buriganga River in Dhaka.
- Zia Memorial Museum is housed in an interesting mock-Tudor mansion. Among its collection is the microphone and transmitter with which President Shaheed Ziaur Rahman proclaimed the country's independence in 1971, and one can see the blood-stained and bullet-damaged wall at the foot of the stairs where Zia was shot.
- Lalbagh Fort is an incomplete seventeenth century Mughal fort complex in Dhaka. The construction was started in 1678 AD by Mughal Subahdar Muhammad Azam Shah.
- Shiva Temple in Puthia consists of a cluster of notable old Hindu temples in Puthia Upazila, Rajshahi Division, Bangladesh.

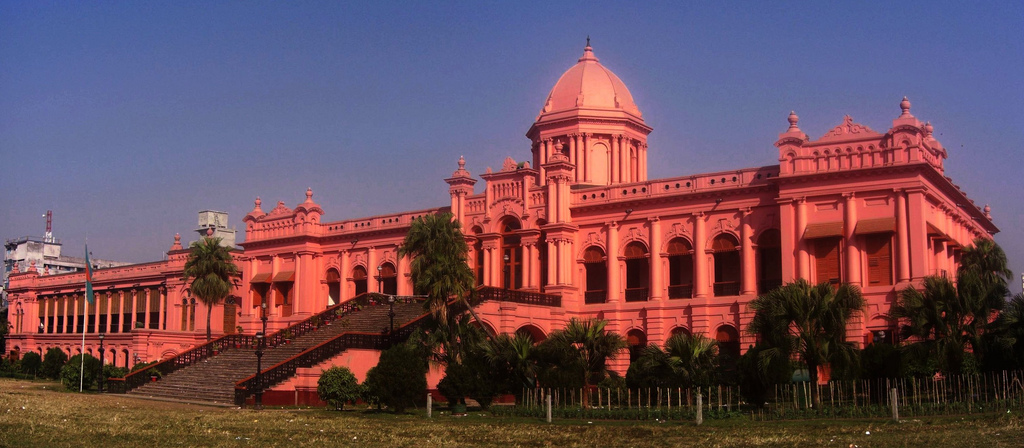
Ahsan Manzil Built by Khwaja Abdul Ghani in 1872 and named after his son Khwaja Ahsanullah, the Nawab of Dhaka.

Bangladesh Last House, the last house of Bangladesh located in the Bangladesh–India border at Jointa Hill Resort, this is a popular tourist destination.

== Nature tourism ==
Bangladesh has geographical diversity, which resulted in varieties of nature tourism.

- The Sundarbans is the largest single block of tidal halophytic mangrove forest in the world and has also been enlisted among the top 14 finalists in the New 7 Wonders of Nature.

=== Wildlife in Bangladesh ===
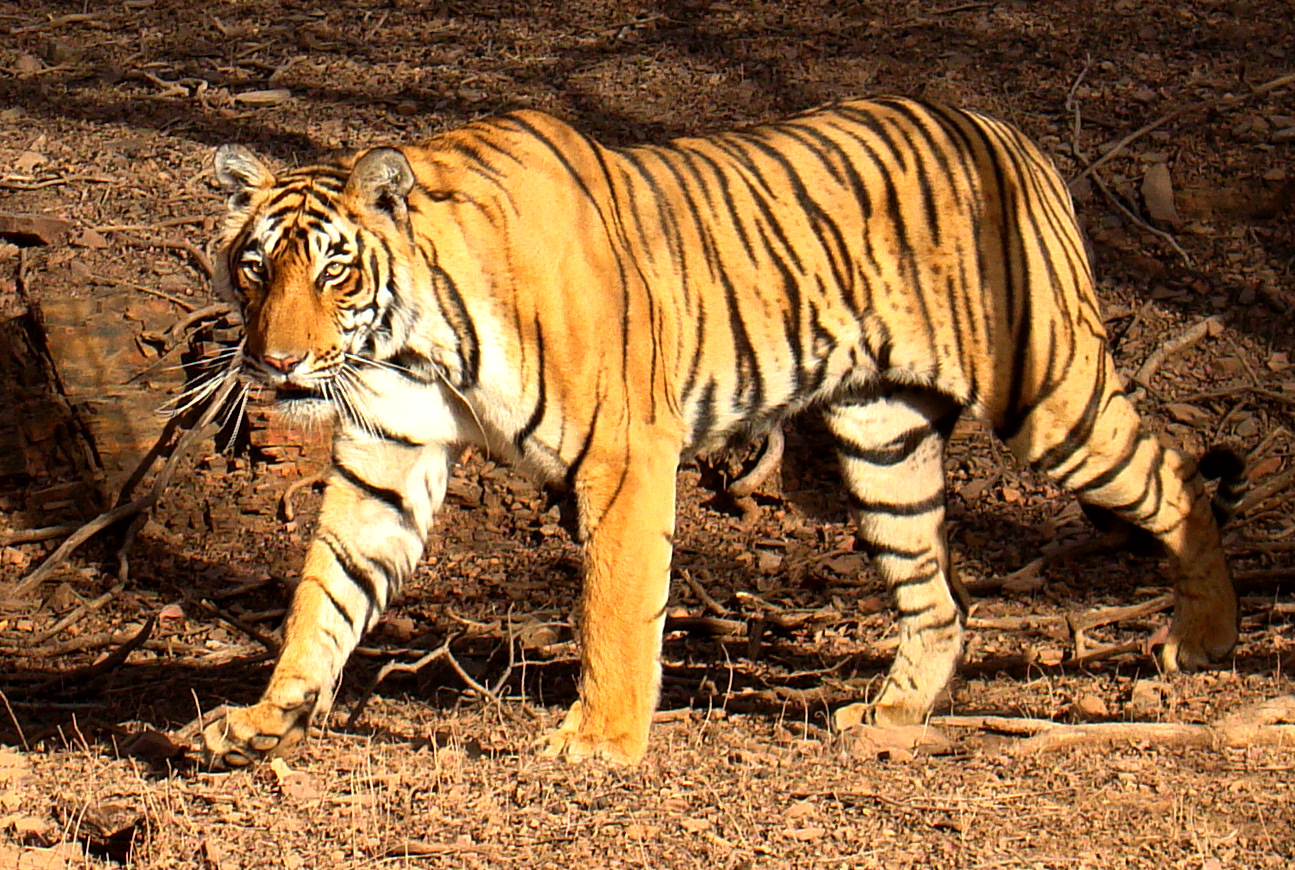
Bangladesh is the home of Royal Bengal tiger.

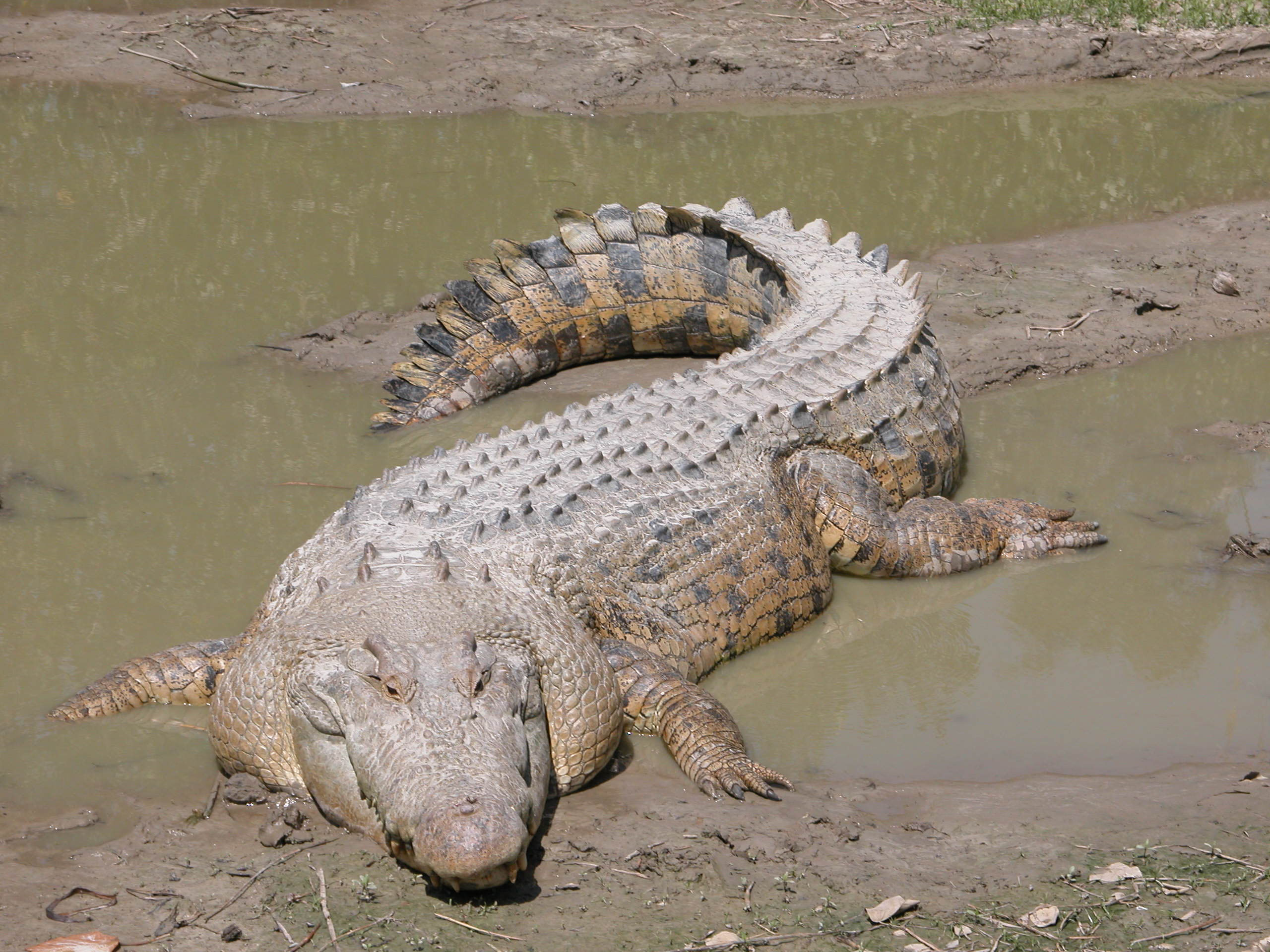
Saltwater crocodile the largest of all living reptiles.

Bangladesh is home to several well-known mammals including the Bengal tiger, the Asian elephant, the hoolock gibbon and the Asian black bear. The saltwater crocodile found in Sunderban is the largest of all living reptiles, The king cobra is the world's longest venomous snake and the reticulated python is the longest among all snakes. The country has roughly 53 species of amphibian, 19 species of marine reptiles, 139 species of reptiles, 380 species of birds, 116 species of mammals, and 5 species of marine mammals. In addition to the large bird count, a further 310 species of migratory birds swell bird numbers each year. The vast majority of these creatures currently dwell in an area of land that is approximately 150,000 square kilometres (58,000 mi^{2}) in size. The dhole, also called the Asiatic wild dog, is now endangered by habitat, prey-species loss, and human persecution. Notable animal species that have disappeared from Bangladesh are the one- and two-horned rhinoceros, the gaur, the banteng, swamp deer, nilgai, Indian wolf, wild water buffalo, marsh crocodile and common peafowl.

The world's largest mangrove forest Sundarbans is located in Southwestern Bangladesh. Sundarbans National Parks are UNESCO World Heritage Site.

=== Hill stations ===
- Chittagong
- Bandarban, Chittagong
- Khagrachori, Chittagong
- Rangamati, Chittagong
- Jaflong, Sylhet
- Srimangal county, Moulvibazar
- Durgapur Birisiri Garu Hill Netrakona

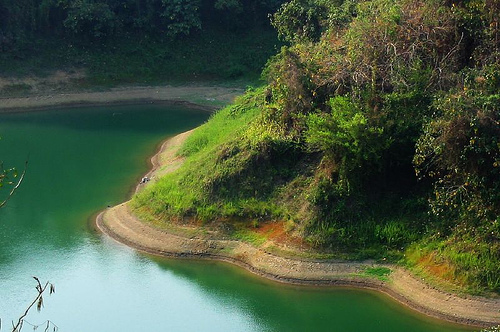
View of Kaptai Lake, Rangamati

=== Lakes ===
- Dhanmondi Lake, Dhaka
- Foy's Lake, Chittagong
- Kaptai Lake, Rangamati
- Madhobpur Lake, Moulvibazar
- Mohamaya Lake, Chittagong
- Vatiary Lake, Chittagong

== Beaches ==
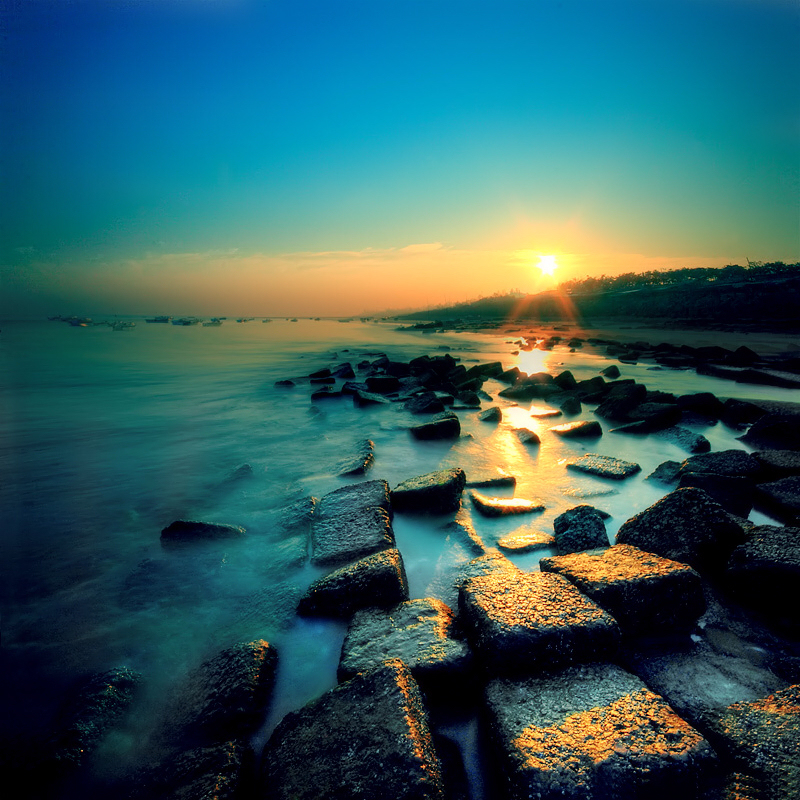
Patenga Sea Beach in Chittagong

Bangladesh offers a wide range of tropical beaches. Cox's Bazar is known for its wide and long sandy beach which is considered as the world's longest natural sandy sea beach. Some of the other famous tourist beaches are:

- St. Martin Island
- Patenga sea beach
- Kuakata sea beach
- Nijhum Dwip

=== Islands ===
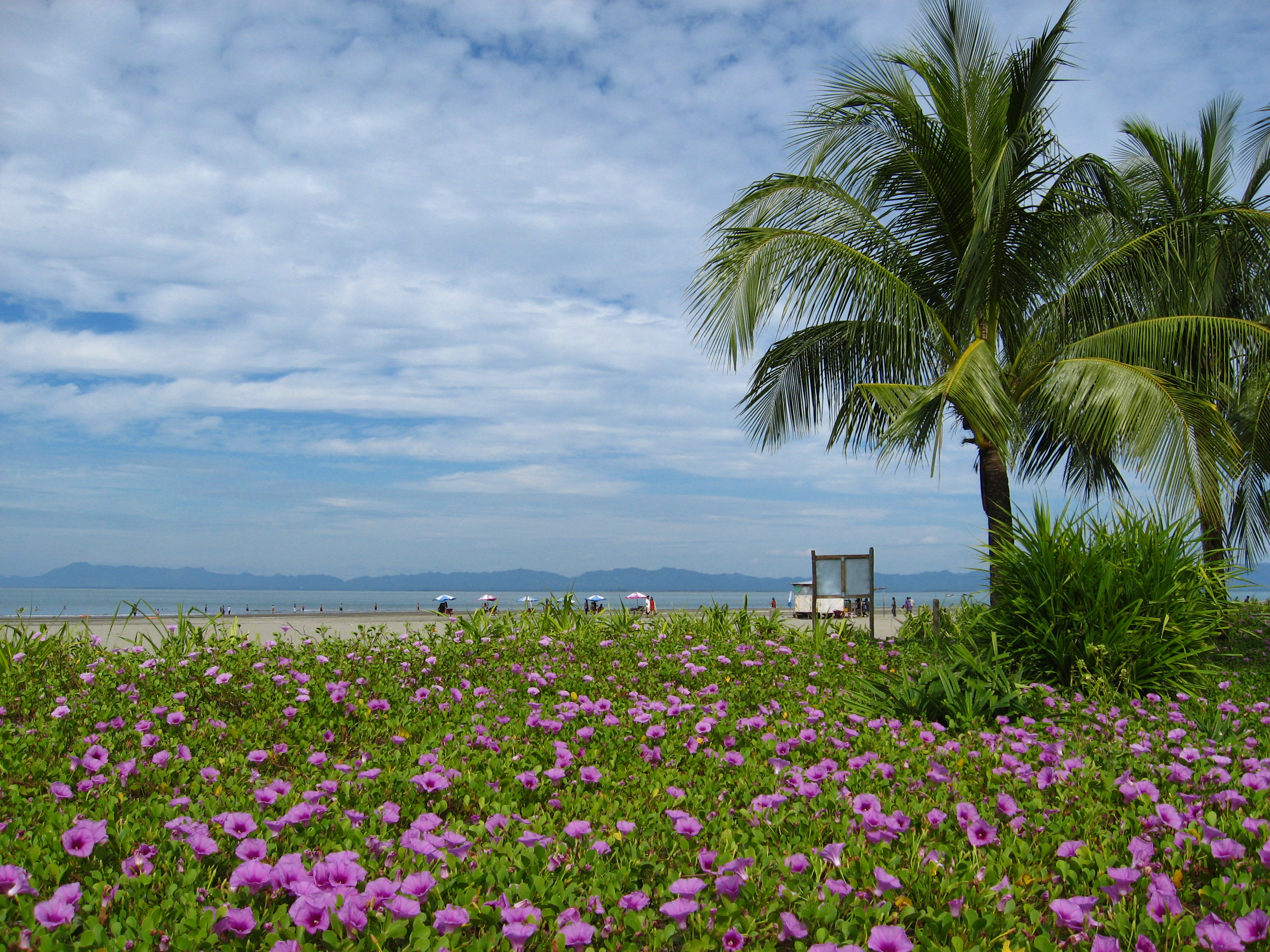
St. Martin's Island

The islands of Bangladesh are scattered along the Bay of Bengal and the river mouth of the Padma. There are more than 30 islands in Bangladesh. Some famous tourist attractions are:

- St. Martin's Island, St. Martin
- Chhera Island, St. Martin
- Bhola Island, Bhola
- Manpura Island
- Nijhum Dwip, Hatiya, Noakhali
- Sandwip Island, Chattogram
- Sonadia Island, Chattogram

== Tourism campaign films ==
In January 2011, two short films titled Beautiful Bangladesh: School of Life were produced by Bangladesh Tourism Board (partner of ICC World Cup Cricket 2011). Both films show a tourist's journey through Bangladesh. The durations of the films were 10 and 3 minutes. The 10-minute-long film was directed by Moinul Hossain Mukul and the 3-minute-long film was directed by Gazi Ahmed Shubhro. Concept and script by Syed Gousul Alam Shaon.

== Shopping ==
While muslin of ancient Dhaka has gone into history, other products such as contemporary paintings, wood works, shital pati (mats that feel cool), bamboo decoration pieces, cane and conch shell products, gold and silver ornament, cotton, silk, gold, silver, jute, reed, brass ware, traditional dolls and leather goods also receive deep appreciation of the lovers of arts and crafts now and over the past centuries. In addition, Bangladesh is famous for pink pearl.

Jamuna Future Park is a notable shopping mall to visit. Bashudhara City inaugurated in 2004 is one of the largest shopping malls in sub-continent.

== See also ==
- Visa policy of Bangladesh
- List of hotels and resorts in Bangladesh
- List of shopping malls in Bangladesh
- List of national monuments of Bangladesh

== Gallery ==
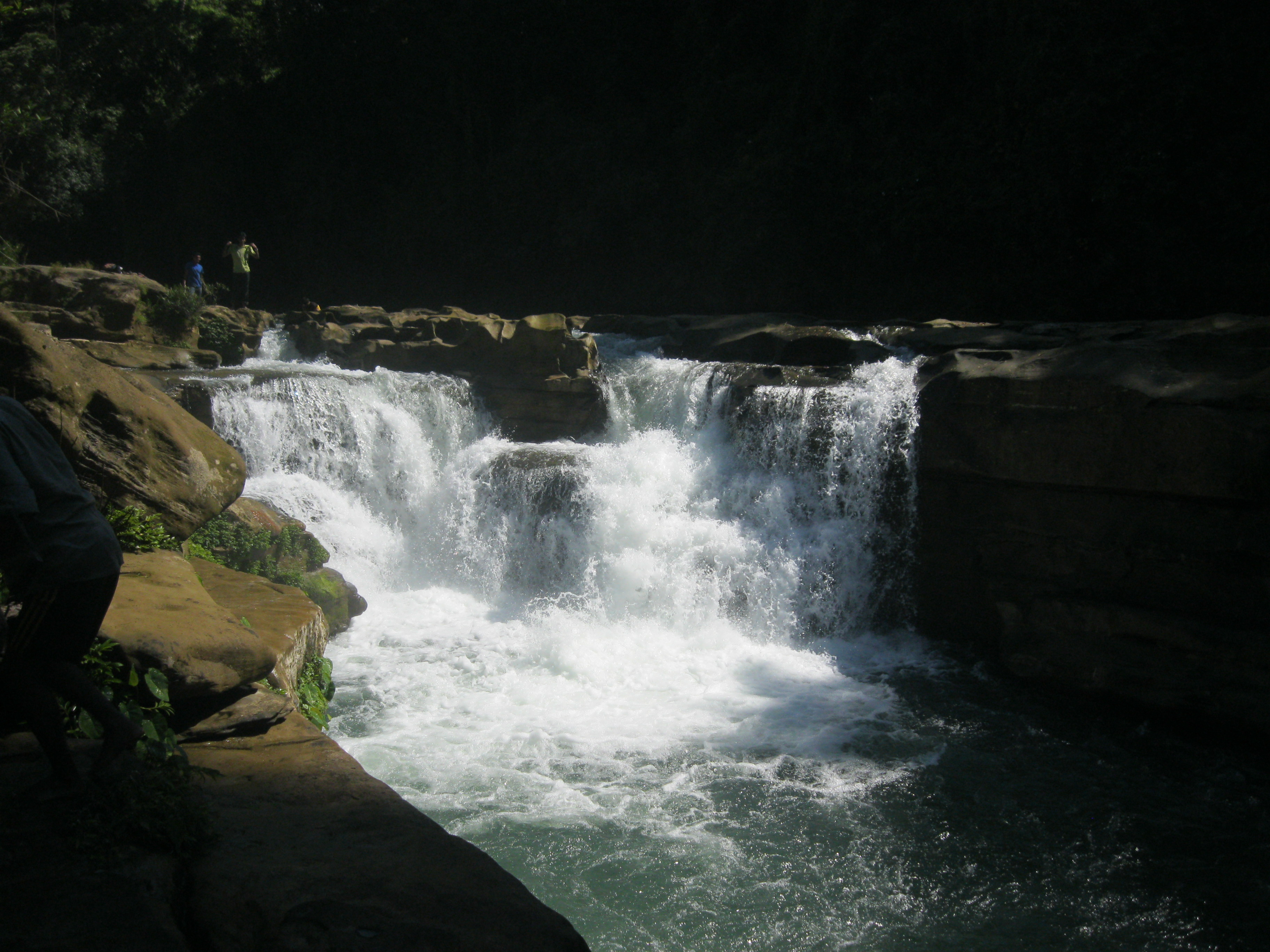
The Nafa-khum falls, Bandarban Chittagong

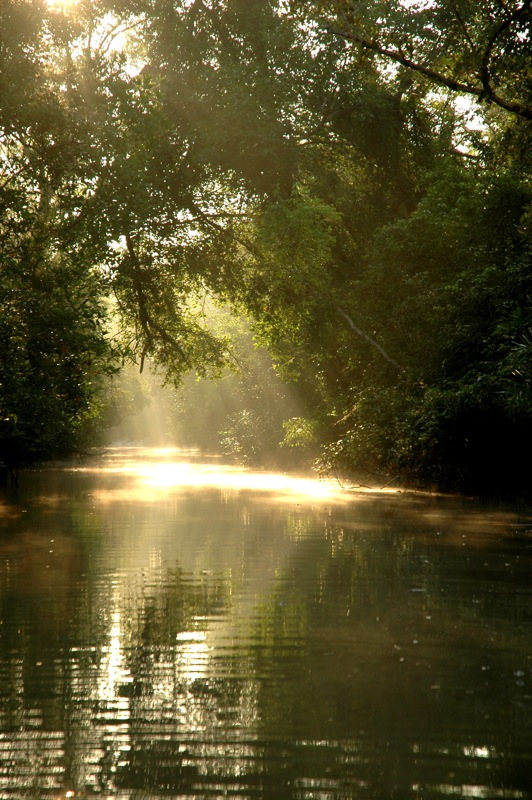
Sundarbans, the largest mangrove forest

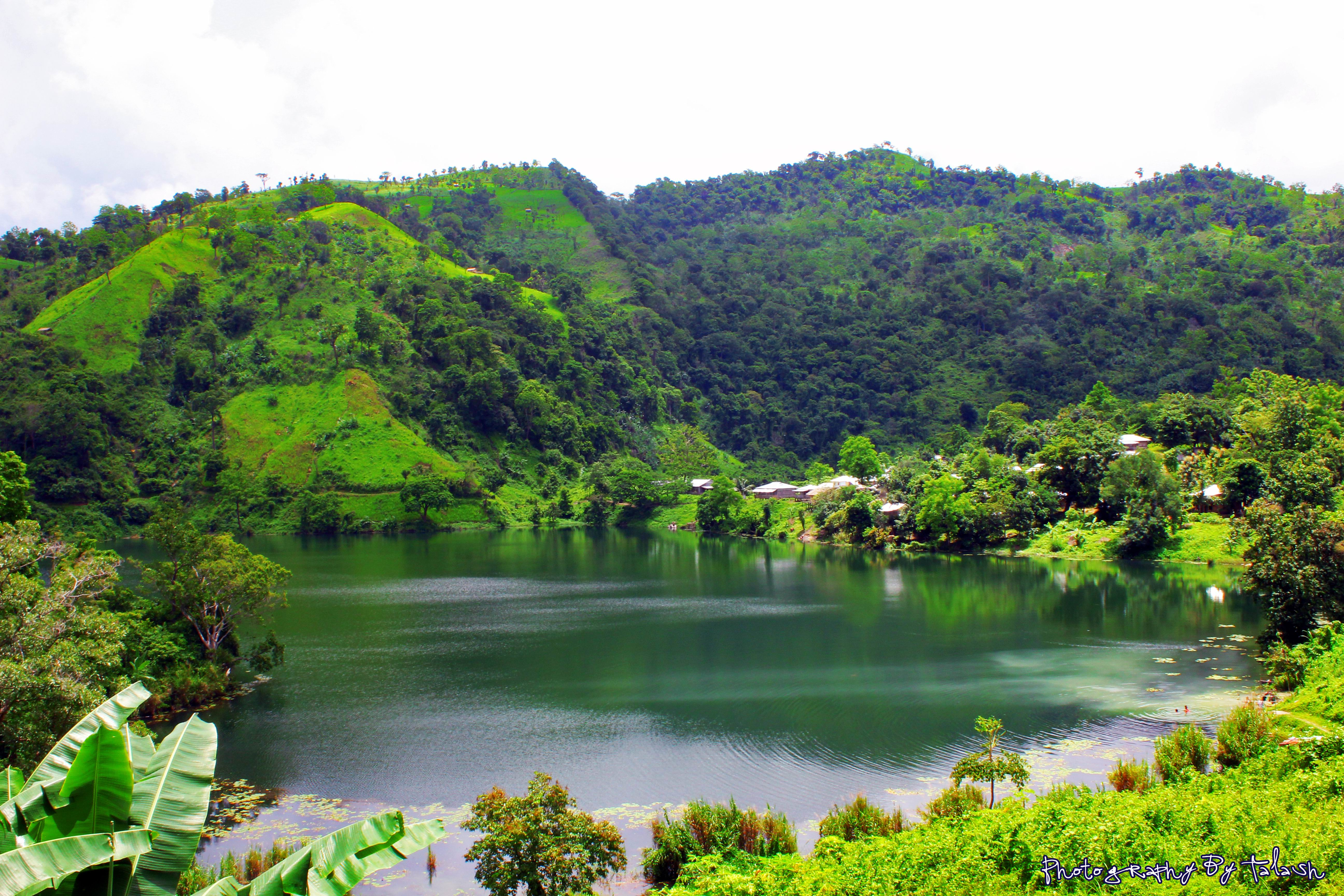
Boga Lake, Bandarban Chittagong

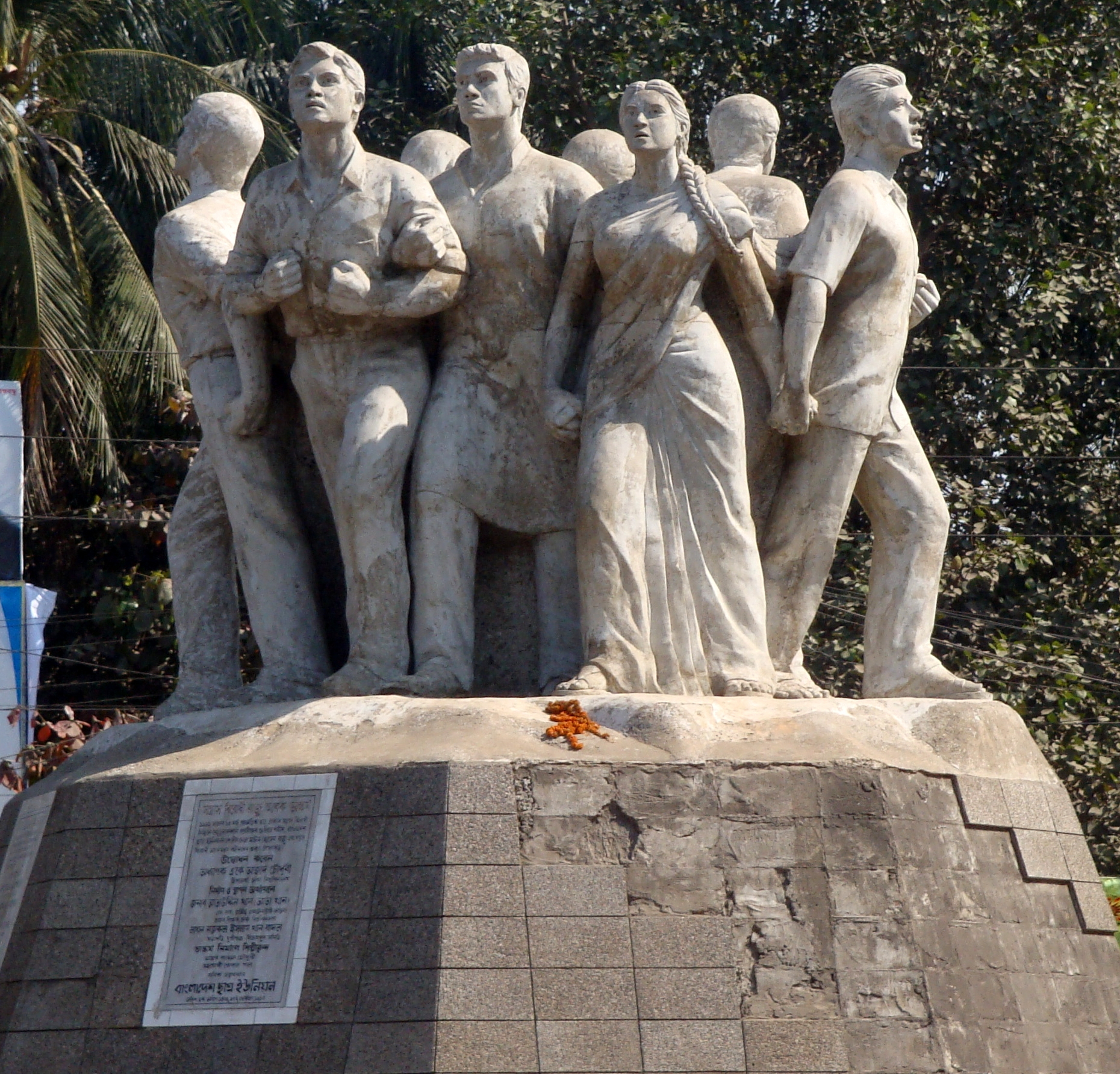
Raju Bhaskorjo University of Dhaka

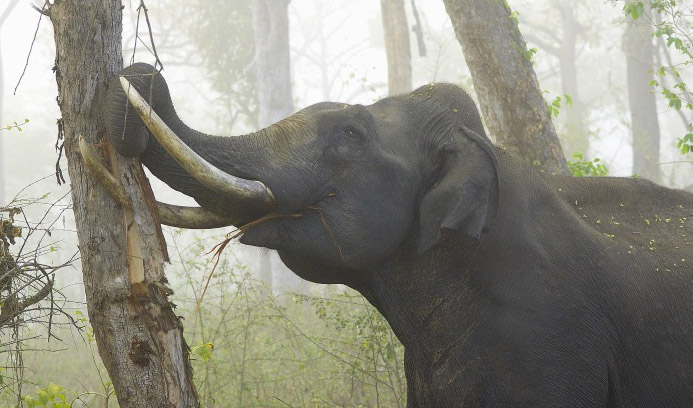
Asian elephant, can be seen in Chittagong

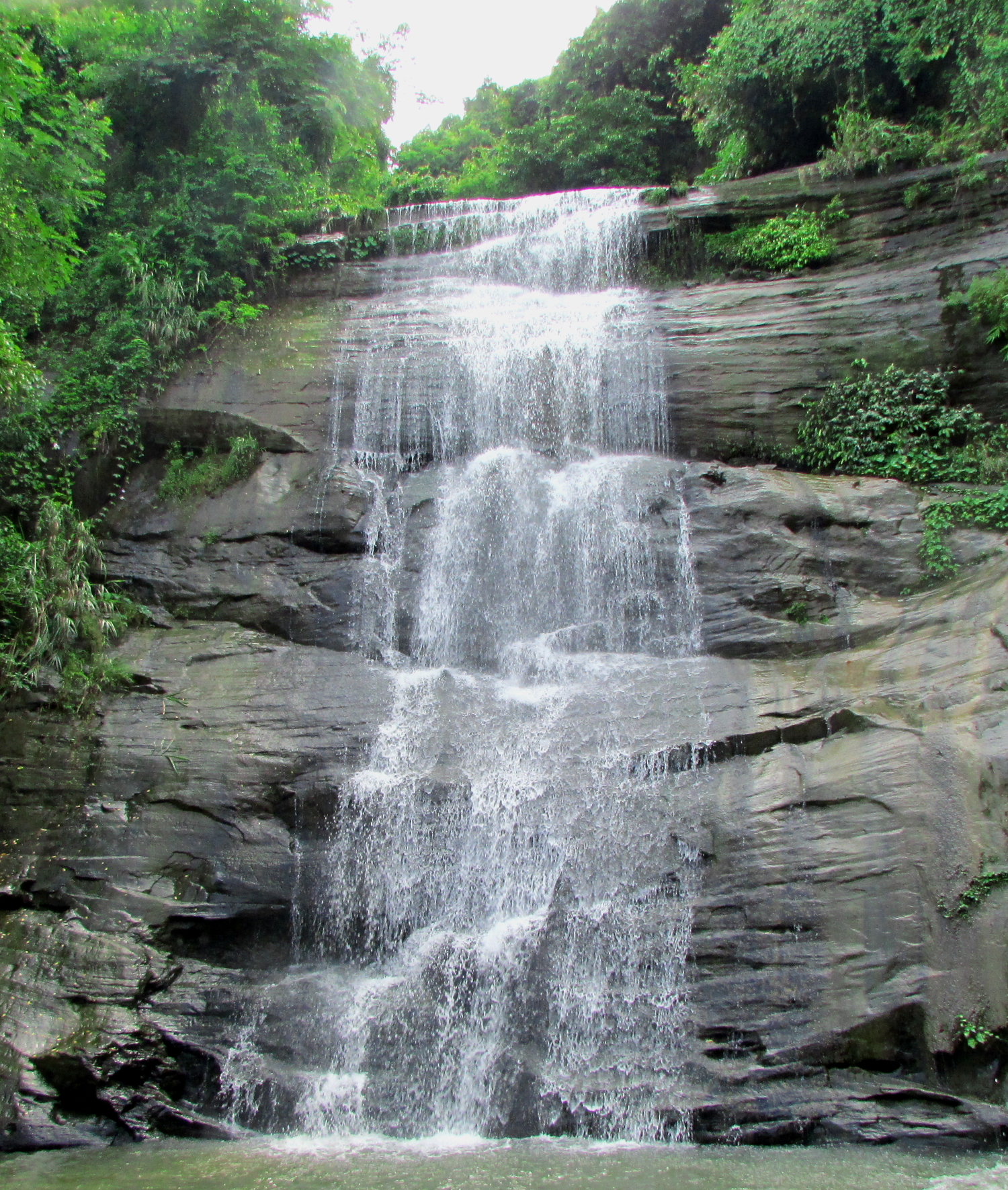
Khoiachora waterfall, Chittagong

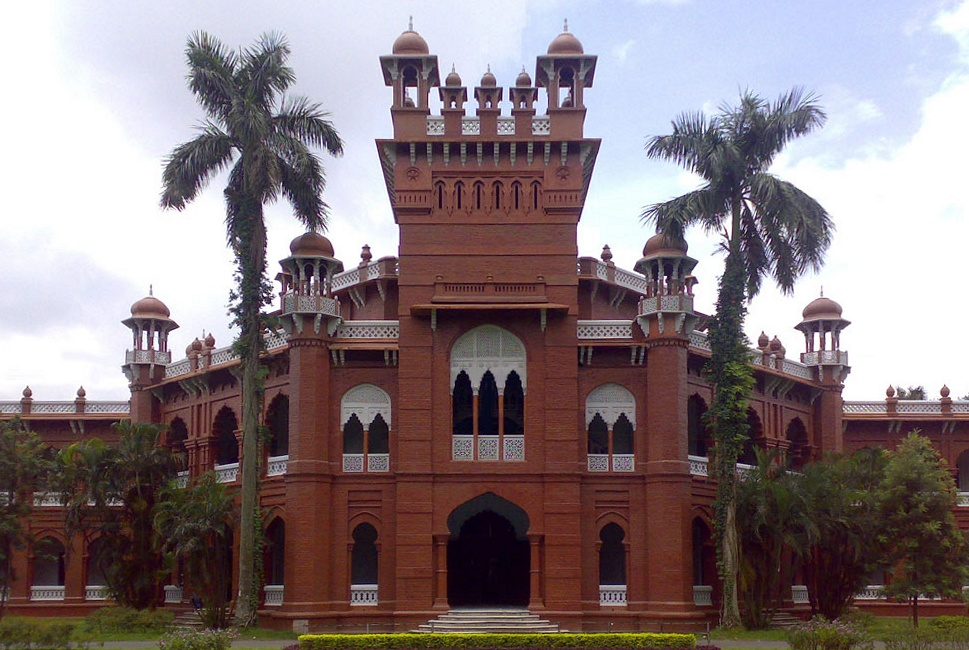
Curzon Hall at University of Dhaka

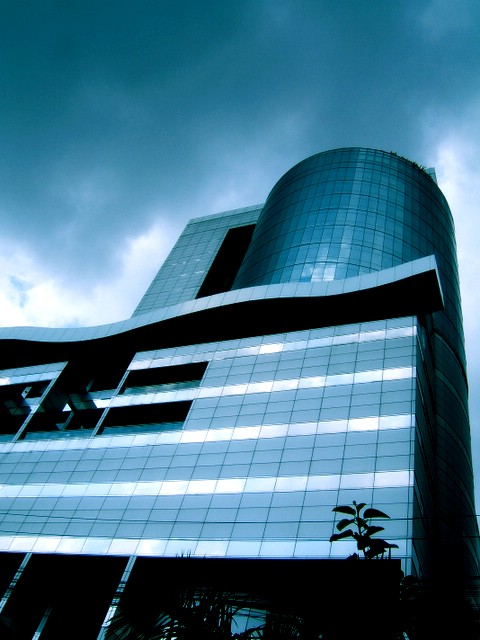
Bashundhara City, one of the largest shopping malls of South Asia

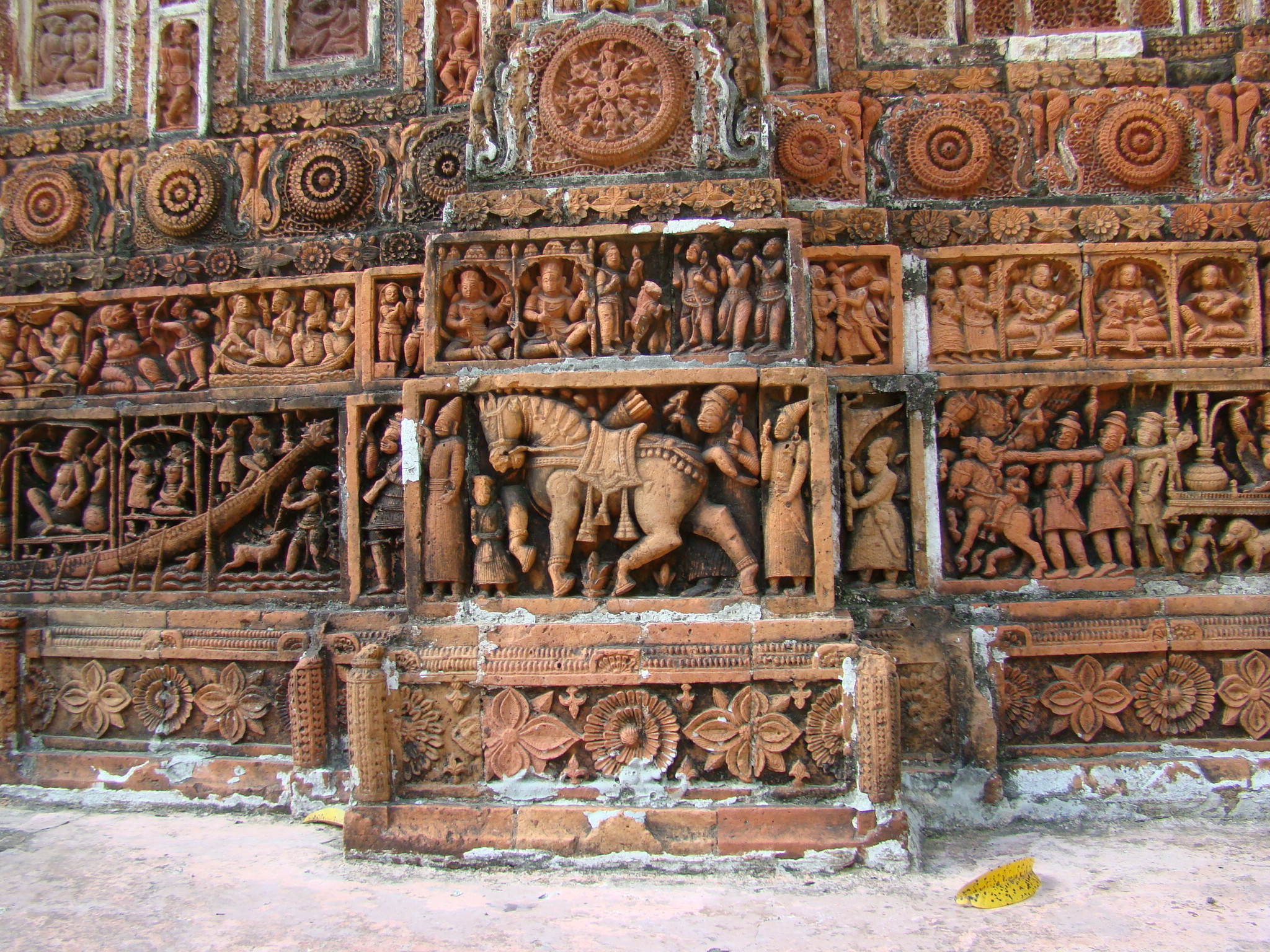
Terracotta designs outside the Kantajew Temple, Dinajpur

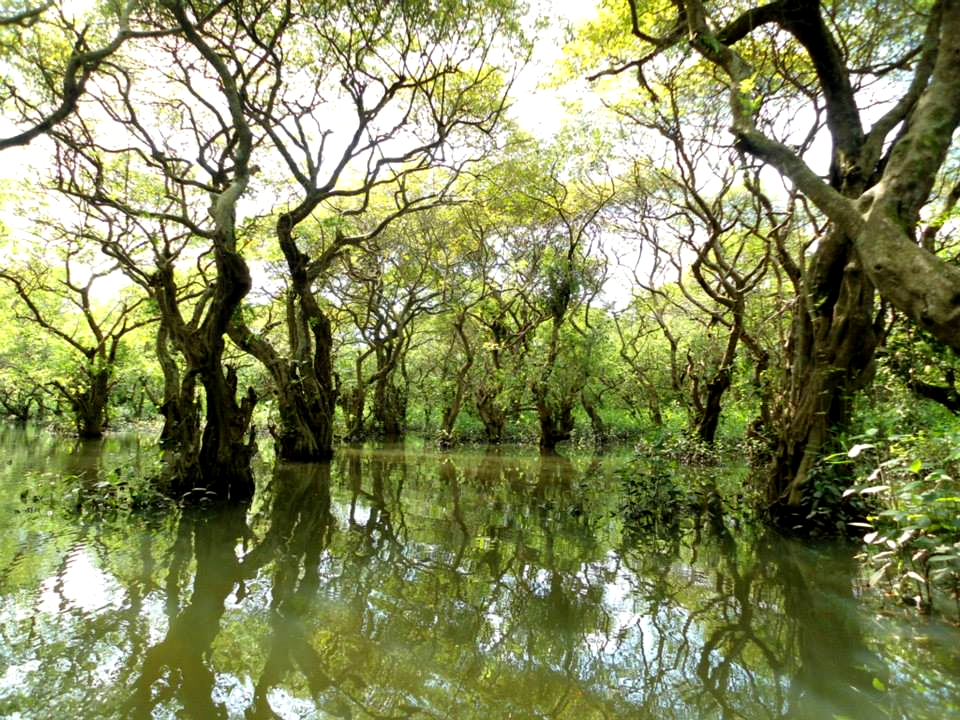
Ratargul Swamp Forest, Sylhet

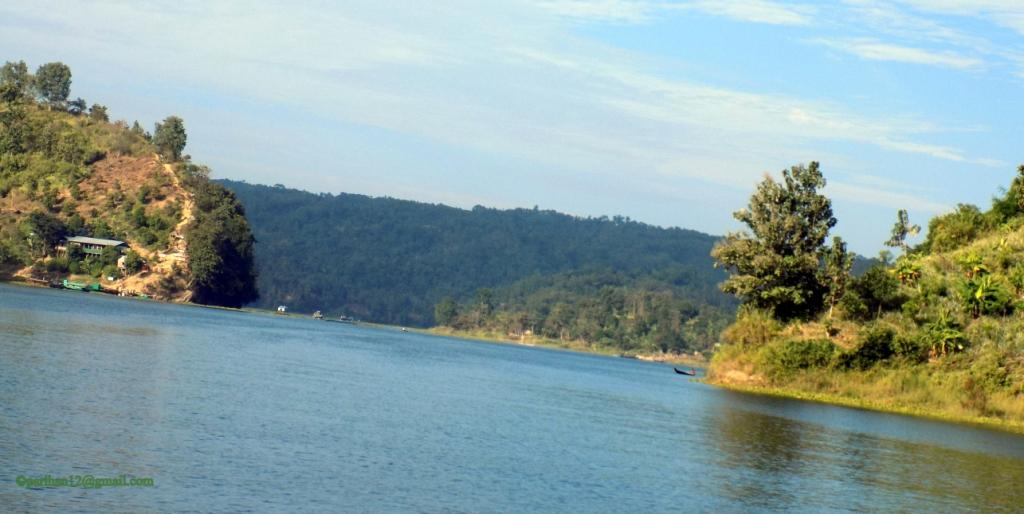
Rangamati Kaptai Lake, Chittagong

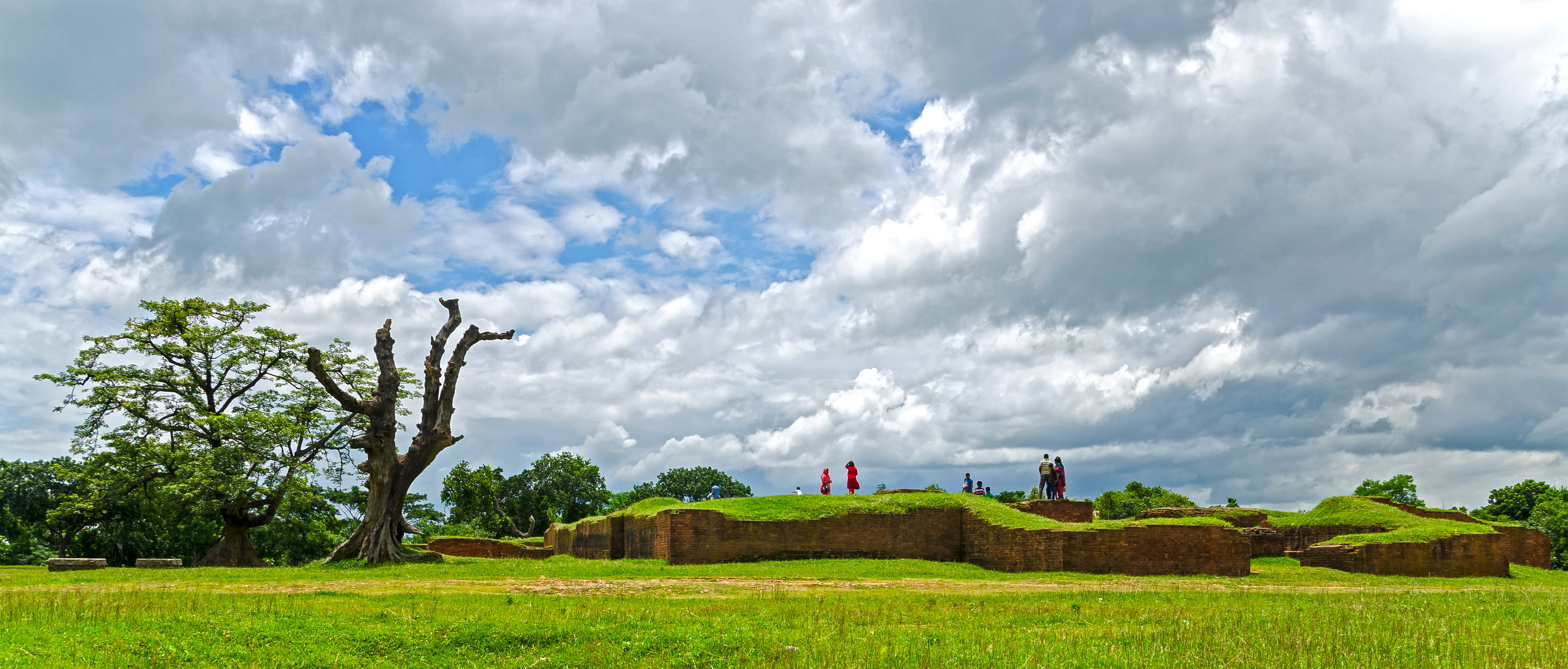
Mainamati, Comilla

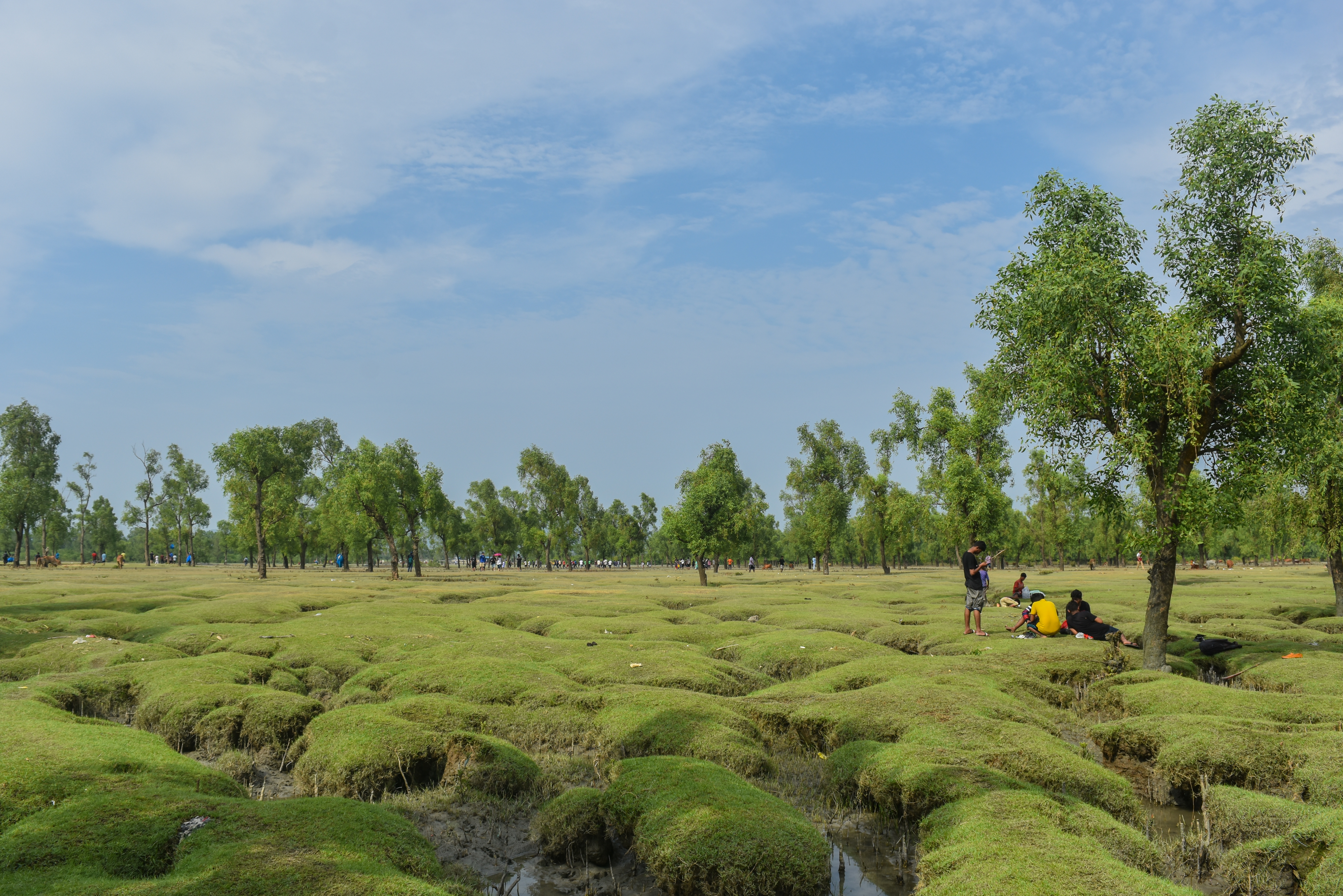
Guliakhali Sea Beach, Chittagong
