= Bangladesh =

Country in South Asia

People's Republic of Bangladesh গণপ্রজাতন্ত্রী বাংলাদেশ (Bengali) Gôṇôprôjātôntrī Bāṅlādēś
- Flag Emblem
- Anthem: আমার সোনার বাংলা (Bengali); Āmār Sōnār Bāṅlā "My Golden Bengal"
- Government Seal

- Capital and largest city: Dhaka; 23°45′50″N 90°23′20″E
- Official language and national language: Bengali
- Other common language: English
- Ethnic groups (2022): 99% Bengali 1% others: Chakmas; Garos; Khasis; Khumis; Manipuris; Marmas; Mizos; Arakanese; Mrus; Santals; Tanchangyas; Tripuris; Bishnupriyas
- Religion (2022): 91.04% Islam (official) (Note: Constitutionally, Bangladesh is a secular state with Islam as its state religion. However, the constitution mandates equal status and rights for other religions, namingly Hinduism, Buddhism and Christianity, and prohibits grating political status to any particular religion. Freedom of religion is one of the fundamental rights of the citizens of Bangladesh.); 7.94% Hinduism; 0.60% Buddhism; 0.30% Christianity; 0.12% other
- Demonym: Bangladeshi
- Government: Unitary parliamentary republic
  - President: Mirza Fakhrul Islam Alamgir
  - Prime Minister: Tarique Rahman
  - Speaker: Hafiz Uddin Ahmad
  - Chief Justice: Zubayer Rahman Chowdhury
- Legislature: Jatiya Sangsad

Independence from Pakistan
  - East Bengal: 15 August 1947
  - East Pakistan: 29 February 1956
  - Proclamation of independence: 26 March 1971
  - Provisional government: 10 April 1971
  - Victory in the Liberation War: 16 December 1971
  - Current constitution: 16 December 1972

Area
  - Total: 148,460 km^{2} (57,320 sq mi) (93rd)
  - Water (%): 6.4
  - Land area: 130,170 km^{2}
  - Water area: 18,290 km^{2}

Population
  - 2026 estimate: ▲179.3 million (8th)
  - 2022 census: 169,828,911 (8th)
  - Density: 1,165/km^{2} (3,017.3/sq mi) (13th)
- GDP (PPP): 2026 estimate
  - Total: ▲$1.909 trillion (25th)
  - Per capita: ▲$10,884 (127th)
- GDP (nominal): 2026 estimate
  - Total: ▲$506.357 billion (36th)
  - Per capita: ▲$2,886 (142nd)
- Gini (2022): ▼30.9 medium inequality
- HDI (2023): ▲0.685 medium (130th)
- Currency: Taka (৳) (BDT)
- Time zone: UTC+6 (BST)
- Date format: dd/mm/yyyy
- Calling code: +880
- ISO 3166 code: BD
- Internet TLD: .bd; .বাংলা

Bangladesh, (Note: /ˌbæŋɡləˈdɛʃ, ˌbɑːŋ-/; Bengali: বাংলাদেশ, romanised: Bāṅlādēś, pronounced [ˈbaŋlaˌdeʃ]) officially the People's Republic of Bangladesh, (Note: Bengali: গণপ্রজাতন্ত্রী বাংলাদেশ, romanised: Gôṇôprôjātôntrī Bāṅlādēś, pronounced [ɡɔnopɾodʒat̪ɔnt̪ɾi‿baŋlad̪eʃ]) is a country in South Asia. It is the eighth-most populous country in the world with a population of almost 180 million within an area of 148,461 square kilometres (57,321 sq mi), making it one of the most densely populated countries on Earth. Bangladesh shares land borders with India to the north, west, and east, and Myanmar to the southeast. It has a coastline along the Bay of Bengal to its south and is separated from Bhutan and Nepal by the Siliguri Corridor, and from China by the Indian states of West Bengal and Sikkim to its north. Dhaka, the capital and largest city, is the nation's political, financial, and cultural centre. Chittagong is the second-largest city and the busiest port of the country.

The territory of present-day Bangladesh was ruled by successive Hindu and Buddhist dynasties in antiquity. Following the Muslim conquest in 1204, the region came under Bengal Sultanate and Mughal rule. As the largest subdivision of the Mughal Empire, Bengal became a major commercial centre, known for its textile industry and agricultural output. The Battle of Plassey in 1757 began British colonial rule, which lasted nearly two centuries; colonial policies redirected wealth from Bengal to Britain, while the region itself suffered repeated deadly famines. After the partition of India in 1947, East Bengal became the eastern wing of the newly formed Dominion of Pakistan and was later renamed East Pakistan.

During more than two decades of political and economic marginalisation under the government based in West Pakistan, East Pakistan saw growing civil unrest that culminated in the 1948–52 language movement, 1969 mass uprising and the 1971 non-cooperation movement. Following the Pakistani military's Operation Searchlight, the Bangladesh Liberation War began. The Mukti Bahini, aided by Indian forces, fought a war of independence, during which Pakistani forces carried out the Bangladesh genocide; Bangladesh became a sovereign nation on 16 December 1971. After independence, Sheikh Mujibur Rahman led the country until his assassination in 1975; Ziaur Rahman, who later came to power, was himself assassinated in 1981. The 1980s were dominated by the dictatorship of Hussain Muhammad Ershad, who was overthrown in a mass uprising in 1990. Since the restoration to parliamentary democracy in 1991, national politics has largely dominated between the Awami League, led by Sheikh Hasina, and the Bangladesh Nationalist Party, led by Khaleda Zia. After more than 15 years of autocratic rule, Hasina was ousted in another mass uprising in 2024.

Bangladesh is a unitary parliamentary republic based on the Westminster system. It has South Asia's second-largest economy and is one of the largest contributors to United Nations peacekeeping operations. Bangladesh consists of eight divisions, 64 districts, 497 upazilas, and 4,599 union councils. It is home to the largest mangrove forest in the world and hosts one of the world's largest refugee populations. Bangladesh faces challenges in corruption, human rights concerns, political instability, and the effects of climate change. It is currently included among the forty-four least developed countries by UNCTAD, though is scheduled for graduation in 2026. Bangladesh is a member state of SAARC and other regional and international organisations.

== Etymology ==
The etymology of Bangladesh ("Bengali country") can be traced to the early 20th century, when Bengali patriotic songs, such as Aaji Bangladesher Hridoy by Rabindranath Tagore and Namo Namo Namo Bangladesh Momo by Kazi Nazrul Islam, used the term in 1905 and 1932 respectively. Starting in the 1950s, Bengali nationalists used the term in political rallies in East Pakistan.

The term Bangla can refer to both the Bengal region and the Bengali language. The origins of the term Bangla are unclear, with theories pointing to a Bronze Age proto-Dravidian tribe, and the Iron Age Vanga Kingdom. The earliest known usage of the term is the Nesari plate in 805 AD. The term Vangala Desa is found in 11th-century South Indian records. The term gained official status during the Sultanate of Bengal in the 14th century. Shamsuddin Ilyas Shah proclaimed himself as the first "Shah of Bangala" in 1342. The word Bangāl became the most common name for the region during the Islamic period. Sixteenth century historian Abu'l-Fazl ibn Mubarak mentions in his Ain-i-Akbari that the addition of the suffix "al" came from the fact that the ancient rajahs of the land raised mounds of earth in lowlands at the foot of the hills which were called "al". This is also mentioned in Ghulam Husain Salim's Riyaz-us-Salatin.

The Indo-Aryan suffix Desh is derived from the Sanskrit word deśha, which means "land" or "country". Hence, the name Bangladesh means "Land of Bengal" or "Country of Bengal".

== History ==
=== Early history ===
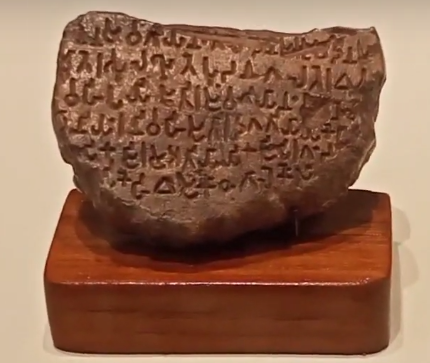
The Mahasthan Brahmi Inscription from the 3rd century BCE, discovered at Mahasthangarh, Bogra District in 1931

The first great indigenous empire to cover the territory was the Maurya Empire (c. 320–185 BC). Following its decline, the kingdom of Samatata arose, which was a tributary state of the Gupta Empire (c. 319–c. 540 AD). Harsha (606–47 AD) drew Samatata into its loosely administered political structure. The Buddhist Pala Empire ruled the region from 750 to 1150 AD. It was overthrown by the Hindu Sena dynasty, which ruled the territory until the Muslim conquests led by Muhammad Bakhtiyar Khalji of the Ghurid dynasty in 1204.

=== Medieval period ===
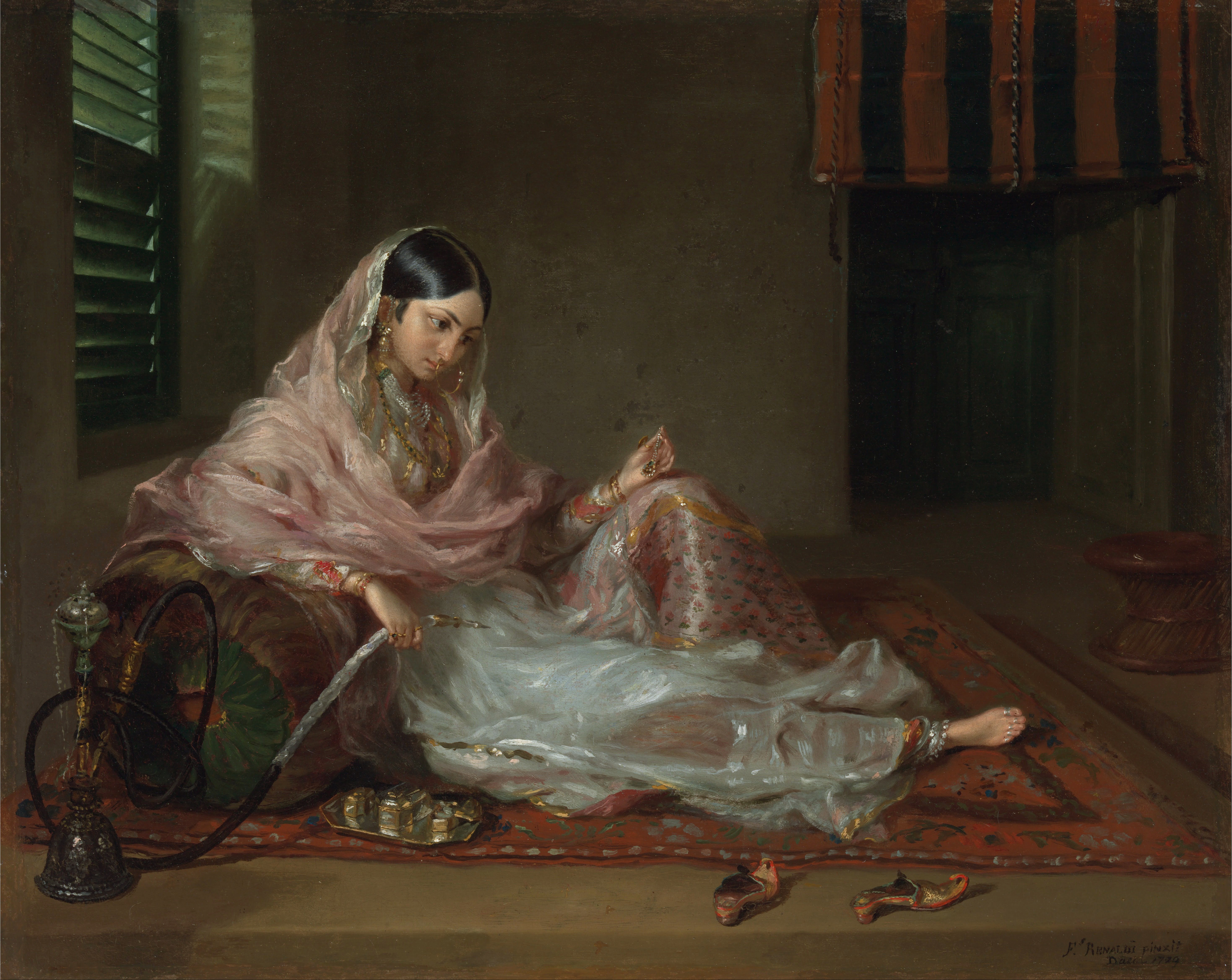
A woman in Dhaka clad in fine Bengali muslin, 18th century

Bengal was then incorporated into the Delhi Sultanate (1206–1526 AD). In 1341, the independent Bengal Sultanate was established by Fakhruddin Mubarak Shah. Two dynasties ruled the independent Sultanate of Bengal consecutively, the Hussain Shahi dynasty and the Ilyas Shahi dynasty, with a brief reign of the House of Ganesha. Amid geographic expansion and economic prosperity, it was regarded by European and Chinese visitors as the "richest country to trade with". The Mughal Empire conquered Bengal in 1576. By the 18th century, the Bengal Subah emerged as one of the wealthiest provinces of the empire and was described as the "Paradise of Countries" and the "breadbasket of India". The region was a major global exporter and producer of cotton textiles (muslin in particular), silk and shipbuilding. Following the decline of the Mughal Empire in the early 1700s, the region became a semi-independent state under the Nawabs of Bengal, founded by Murshid Quli Khan in 1717.

=== British colonial rule ===
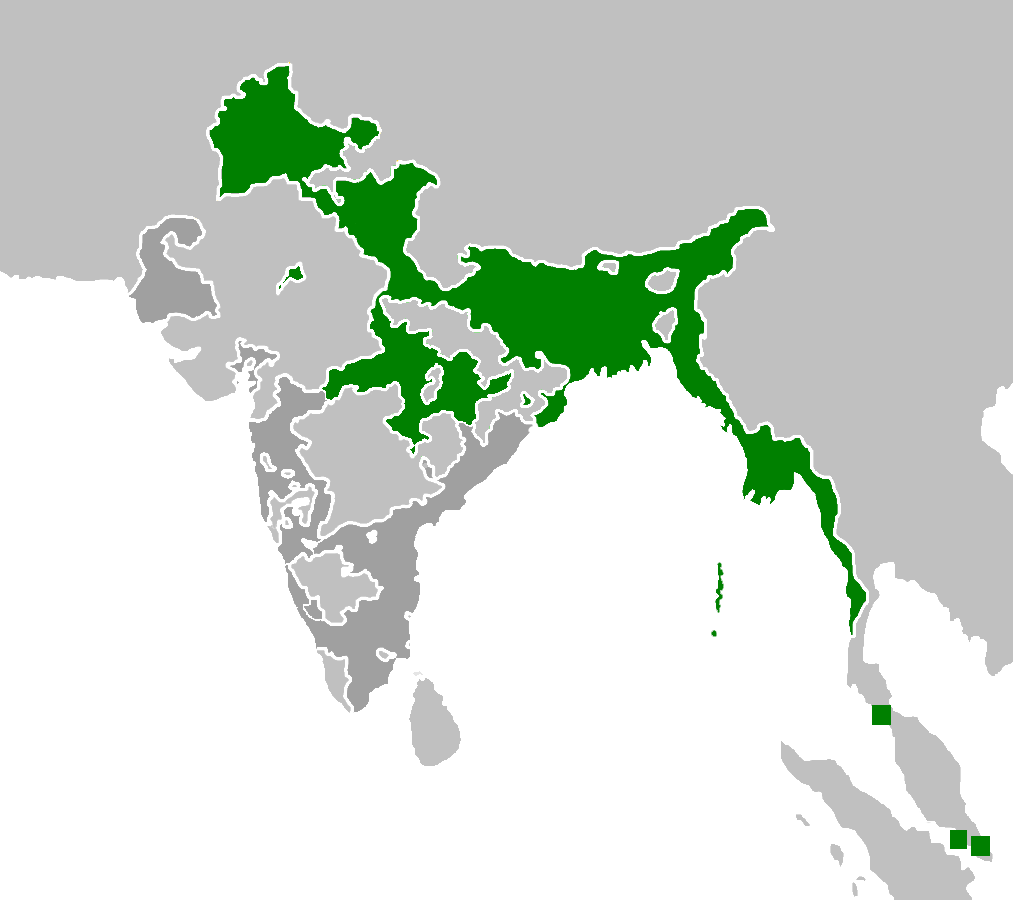
Bengal Presidency British India

The gradual decline of the Mughal authority during the 18th century allowed many European trading companies, particularly the British East India Company to expand the influence over the Bengal region. On 23 June 1757, the state led by Siraj-ud-Daulah was defeated by the East India Company in the Battle of Plassey, largely faciliated by the political conspiracy and betrayal of his commander Mir Jafar. The victory helped to establish British colonial rule over Bengal and led foundations of subsequent British domination of the Indian subcontinent. In 1765, the Mughal emperor Shah Alam II granted the company diwani rights, allowing it to collect revenue from Bengal, Bihar and Orissa, further consolidationg administrative and economic control of the region.

Bengal's economy became increasingly integrated to the economic system of the British Empire and the Industrial Revolution at the expense of an extraordinary capital flight and deindustrialisation following colonial extraction and the collapse of the Bengali textile industry. Estimates of deaths during the Great Bengal famine of 1770 range from one to ten million, killing up to one-third of the total population of the Bengal Presidency.

=== As a part of Pakistan ===
In the aftermath of direct British rule for nearly two centuries, the borders of modern Bangladesh were established with the partition of Bengal between India and Pakistan by the Radcliffe Line during the partition of India on 15 August 1947, when the region became East Bengal as the eastern and most populous wing of the newly formed Dominion of Pakistan—alongside West Pakistan. The western and eastern wings of the newly formed Pakistan were geographically separated by a distance of over 1,000 miles, which became the root cause of deep economic inequality. Khawaja Nazimuddin was East Bengal's first chief minister with Frederick Chalmers Bourne its governor. The All Pakistan Awami Muslim League was formed in 1949. In 1950, the East Bengal Legislative Assembly enacted land reform, abolishing the Permanent Settlement and the zamindari system. The Awami Muslim League was renamed as a more "secular" Awami League in 1953. The first constituent assembly was dissolved in 1954. The United Front coalition led by A. K. Fazlul Huq swept aside the Muslim League in a landslide victory in the 1954 East Bengali legislative election. East Bengal was renamed East Pakistan in 1956 as part of the One Unit Scheme under the new constitution, and the province became a vital part of the Southeast Asia Treaty Organization.

Amidst rising cultural and societal differences, the brutal government crackdown on the 1952 Bengali language movement to establish Bengali as the official language of Pakistan spurred Bengali nationalism and pro-democracy movements. Pakistan adopted a new constitution in 1956. The Pakistan Armed Forces imposed martial law in 1958, following a coup d'état, with Ayub Khan establishing a dictatorship for over a decade. A new constitution was introduced in 1962, replacing the parliamentary system with a presidential and gubernatorial system (based on electoral college selection) known as "Basic Democracy". In 1962, Dhaka became the seat of the National Assembly of Pakistan, a move seen as appeasing increased Bengali nationalism. In 1966, Awami League leader Sheikh Mujibur Rahman announced a six-point movement for a federal parliamentary democracy.

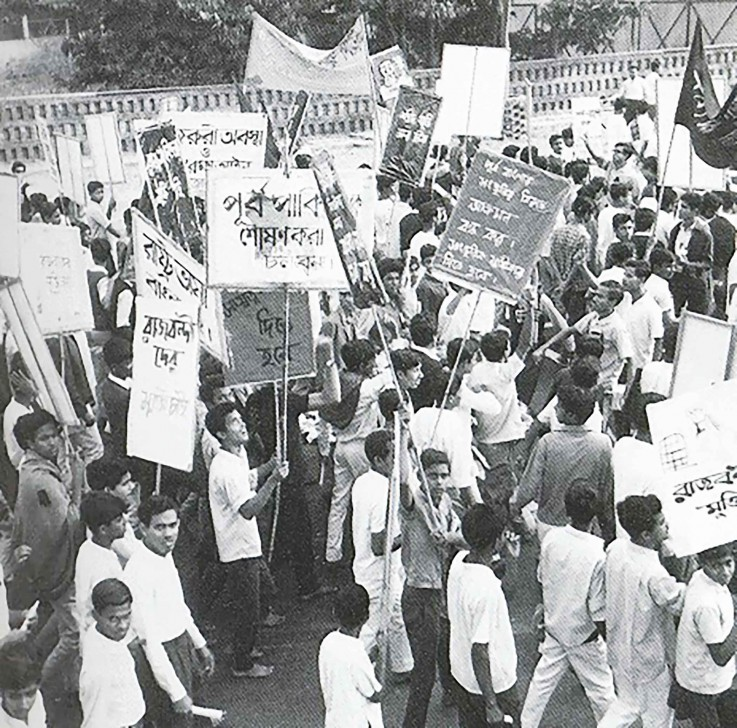
A student procession at the University of Dhaka campus during the mass protests and riots of 1969

Ethnic, linguistic, and cultural discrimination was common in Pakistan's civil and military services, in which Bengalis were under-represented; leading to East Pakistan forging a distinct political identity. Authorities banned Bengali literature and music in the state media. The Pakistani government practised extensive economic discrimination against East Pakistan, including the refusal for foreign aid allocation. Despite generating 70% of Pakistan's export revenue with jute and tea, East Pakistan received much less government spending. Notable economists from East Pakistan, including Rehman Sobhan and Nurul Islam, demanded a separate foreign exchange account for the eastern wing, also pointing to the existence of two different economies within Pakistan itself, dubbed the Two-Economies Theory. Sheikh Mujibur Rahman was arrested for treason in the Agartala Conspiracy Case and was released during the 1969 uprising in East Pakistan which resulted in Ayub Khan's resignation. General Yahya Khan assumed power, reintroducing martial law.

After the Pakistan Government's poor response to the 1970 Bhola Cyclone which left over 500,000 people dead, Abdul Hamid Khan Bhashani, a prominent political figure who had previously led multiple rebellion against the British Raj, was the first ever Bengali to declare independence of East Pakistan in a massive public rally on 23 November 1970 but it was not officially recognized. After the December 1970 elections, the Bengali-nationalist Awami League won 167 of 169 East Pakistani seats in the National Assembly. The League claimed the right to form a government and develop a new constitution but was strongly opposed by the Pakistani military and the Pakistan Peoples Party led by Zulfikar Ali Bhutto.

The 7 March Speech of Mujib led to a non-cooperation movement. The autocratic Pakistani government then initiated Operation Searchlight on 25 March 1971 in response. Before Sheikh Mujibur Rahman was arrested by the Pakistani Army on 26 March 1971, he proclaimed independence of Bangladesh via telegram which Major Ziaur Rahman publicly broadcast on behalf of Mujib. A nine-month-long bloody liberation war ensued, during which a genocide of ethnic Bengalis occurred. The culmination of the war established Bangladesh as a sovereign nation following Pakistani surrender on 16 December 1971.

=== Independent Bangladesh ===
The Constitution of Bangladesh was enacted on 4 November 1972. Following independence, the Mujib-led government faced allegations of corruption and mismanagement during a period of lawlessness and economic crisis. Efforts to establish One-party socialism and a large famine in 1974 led to Mujib's assassination in 1975 following a significant decline in his popularity. The presidency was then transferred to Ziaur Rahman, who re-established public order, industrialised agriculture, founded the Bangladesh Nationalist Party and initiated the creation of the South Asian Association for Regional Cooperation. Ziaur Rahman founded the Bangladesh Nationalist Party on 1 September 1978. Following Rahman's assassination in 1981, the ensuing decade was a military dictatorship under Hussain Muhammad Ershad that saw infrastructural development, devolution reforms, privatisation of nationalised industries and the declaration of Islam as the state religion in 1988.

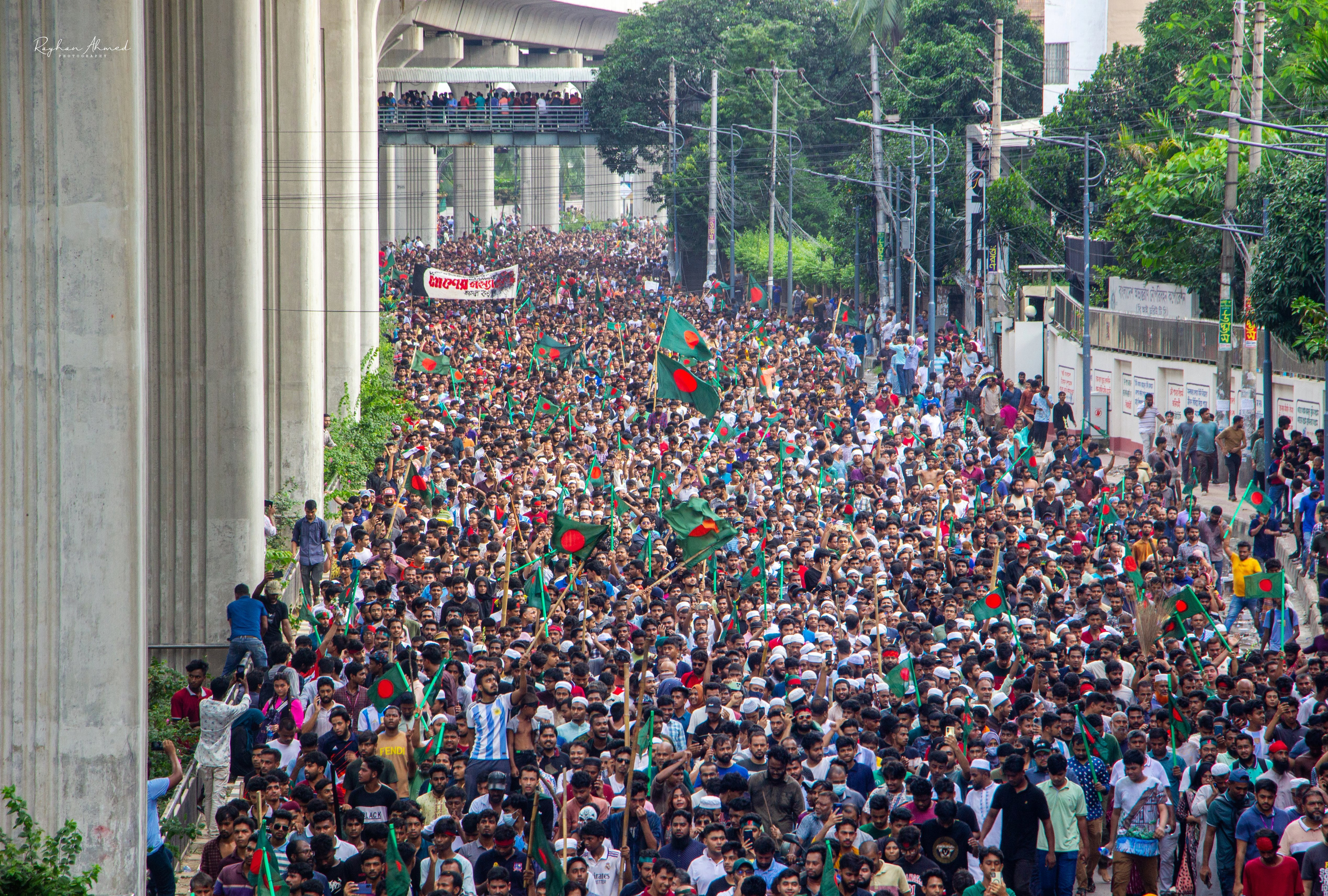
Victory march by protesters after the resignation of Sheikh Hasina in 2024

After the restoration of parliamentary democracy in 1991, power alternated between Khaleda Zia of the BNP and Sheikh Hasina of the Awami League, an era dubbed the Battle of Begums—which shaped national politics until 2024. The country under Sheikh Hasina's leadership saw economic progress alongside criticism over democratic backsliding, corruption, and human rights abuses. Hasina won her second, third and fourth consecutive terms in the 2014, 2018 and the 2024 general elections; the 2014, 2018 and 2024 elections were criticized by opposition parties and outside observers over boycotts, violence, and restrictions on political competition. Following a July Uprising against the authoritarian government, Hasina was forced to resign and flee to India on 5 August 2024. An interim government was formed in August 2024, with Nobel laureate Muhammad Yunus as the Chief Adviser. After the 2026 general election the Bangladesh Nationalist Party (BNP) returned to power with Chairman Tarique Rahman being inaugurated as the Prime Minister of Bangladesh on 17 February 2026. Bangladesh Jamaat-e-Islami became the main opposition party.

Since the early 1990s, driven by free market policies and economic liberalisation measures, Bangladesh's economy has grown rapidly, driven in part by its large textile industry, which is the second-largest in the world. It has emerged as the second-largest economy in South Asia, surpassing the nominal GDP per capita of neighbouring India since 2018. Bangladesh has reduced its poverty rate, which has gone down from 80% in 1971, to 44.2% in 1991, and all the way down to 18.7% in 2022. Its Human Development Index growth during the 21st century was surpassed only by China. As part of the green transition, Bangladesh's industrial sector emerged as a leader in building green factories, with the country having the largest number of certified green factories in the world. It has also given shelter to over a million Rohingya refugees fleeing the Rohingya genocide since 2017, which has strained its resources and highlighted its humanitarian commitments.

== Geography ==
Physical map of Bangladesh

Bangladesh is in South Asia on the Bay of Bengal. It is surrounded almost entirely by neighbouring India, and shares a small border with Myanmar to its southeast, though it lies very close to Nepal, Bhutan, and China. The country is divided into three regions. Most of the country is dominated by the fertile Ganges Delta, the largest river delta in the world. The northwest and central parts of the country are formed by the Madhupur and the Barind plateaus. The northeast and southeast are home to evergreen hill ranges.

The Ganges delta is formed by the confluence of the Ganges (local name Padma or Pôdda), Brahmaputra (Jamuna or Jomuna), and Meghna rivers and their tributaries. The Ganges unites with the Jamuna (main channel of the Brahmaputra) and later joins the Meghna, finally flowing into the Bay of Bengal. Bangladesh is called the "Land of Rivers", as it is home to over 57 trans-boundary rivers, the most of any nation-state. Water issues are politically complicated since Bangladesh is downstream of India.

Bangladesh is predominantly rich fertile flat land. Most of it is less than 12 m (39 ft) above sea level, and it is estimated that about 10% of its land would be flooded if the sea level were to rise by 1 m (3.3 ft). 12% of the country is covered by hill systems. The country's haor wetlands are of significance to global environmental science. The highest point in Bangladesh is the Saka Haphong, located near the border with Myanmar, with an elevation of 1,064 m (3,491 ft). Previously, either Keokradong or Tazing Dong were considered the highest.

In Bangladesh forest cover is around 14% of the total land area, equivalent to 1,883,400 hectares (ha) of forest in 2020, down from 1,920,330 hectares (ha) in 1990. In 2020, naturally regenerating forest covered 1,725,330 hectares (ha) and planted forest covered 158,070 hectares (ha). Of the naturally regenerating forest 0% was reported to be primary forest (consisting of native tree species with no clearly visible indications of human activity) and around 33% of the forest area was found within protected areas. For the year 2015, 100% of the forest area was reported to be under public ownership.

=== Climate ===
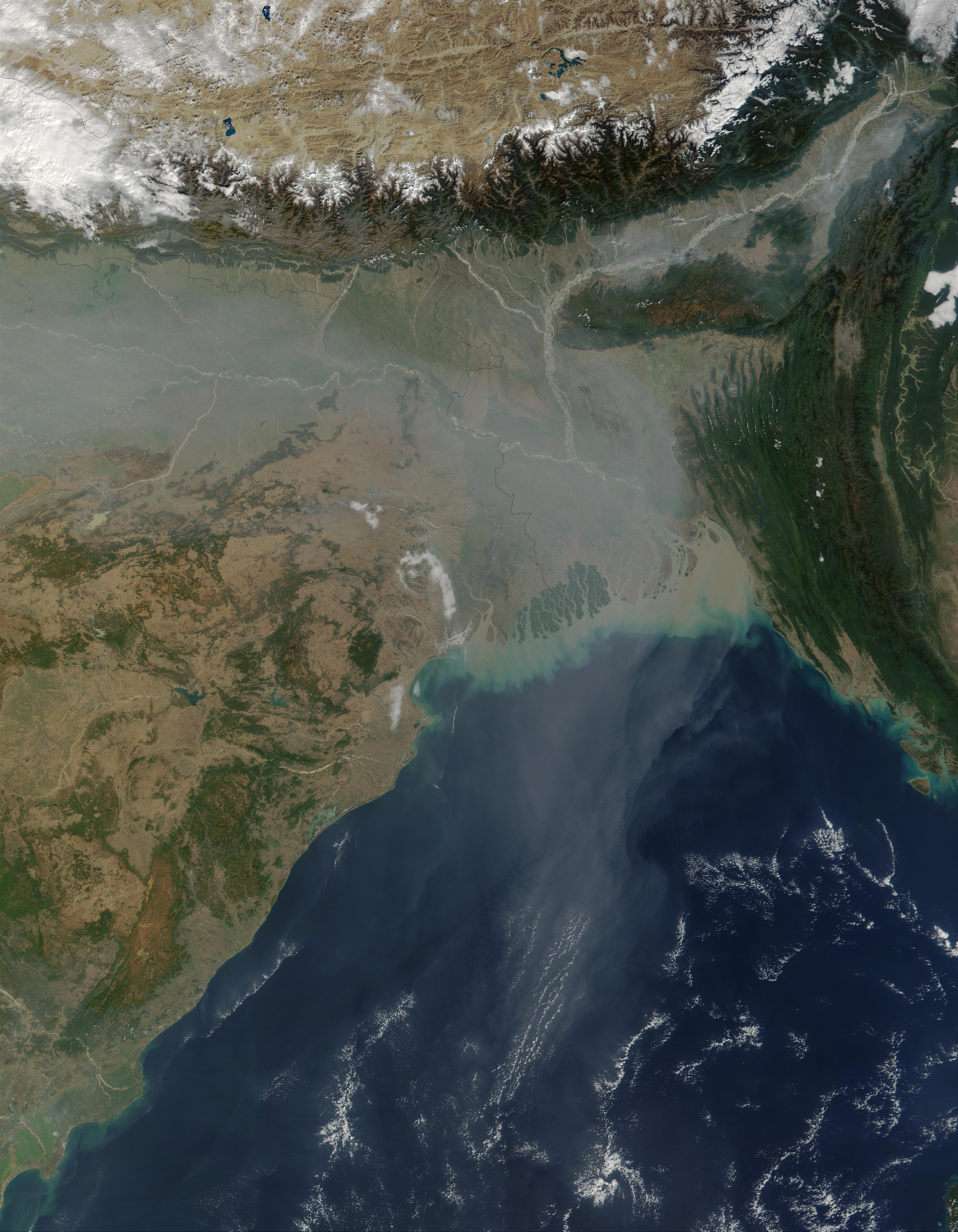
A photo from space showing the pollution over Bangladesh

Straddling the Tropic of Cancer, Bangladesh's climate is tropical, with a mild winter from October to March and a hot, humid summer from March to June. The country has never recorded an air temperature below 0 °C (32 °F), with a record low of 1.1 °C (34.0 °F) in the northwest city of Dinajpur on 3 February 1905. A warm and humid monsoon season lasts from June to October and supplies most of the country's rainfall. Natural calamities, such as floods, tropical cyclones, tornadoes, and tidal bores occur almost every year, combined with the effects of deforestation, soil degradation and erosion. The cyclones of 1970 and 1991 were particularly devastating, the latter killing approximately 140,000 people.

In September 1998, Bangladesh saw the most severe flooding in modern history, after which two-thirds of the country went underwater, along with a death toll of 1,000. As a result of various international and national level initiatives in disaster risk reduction, the human toll and economic damage from floods and cyclones have come down over the years. The 2007 South Asian floods ravaged areas across the country, leaving five million people displaced, with a death toll around 500.

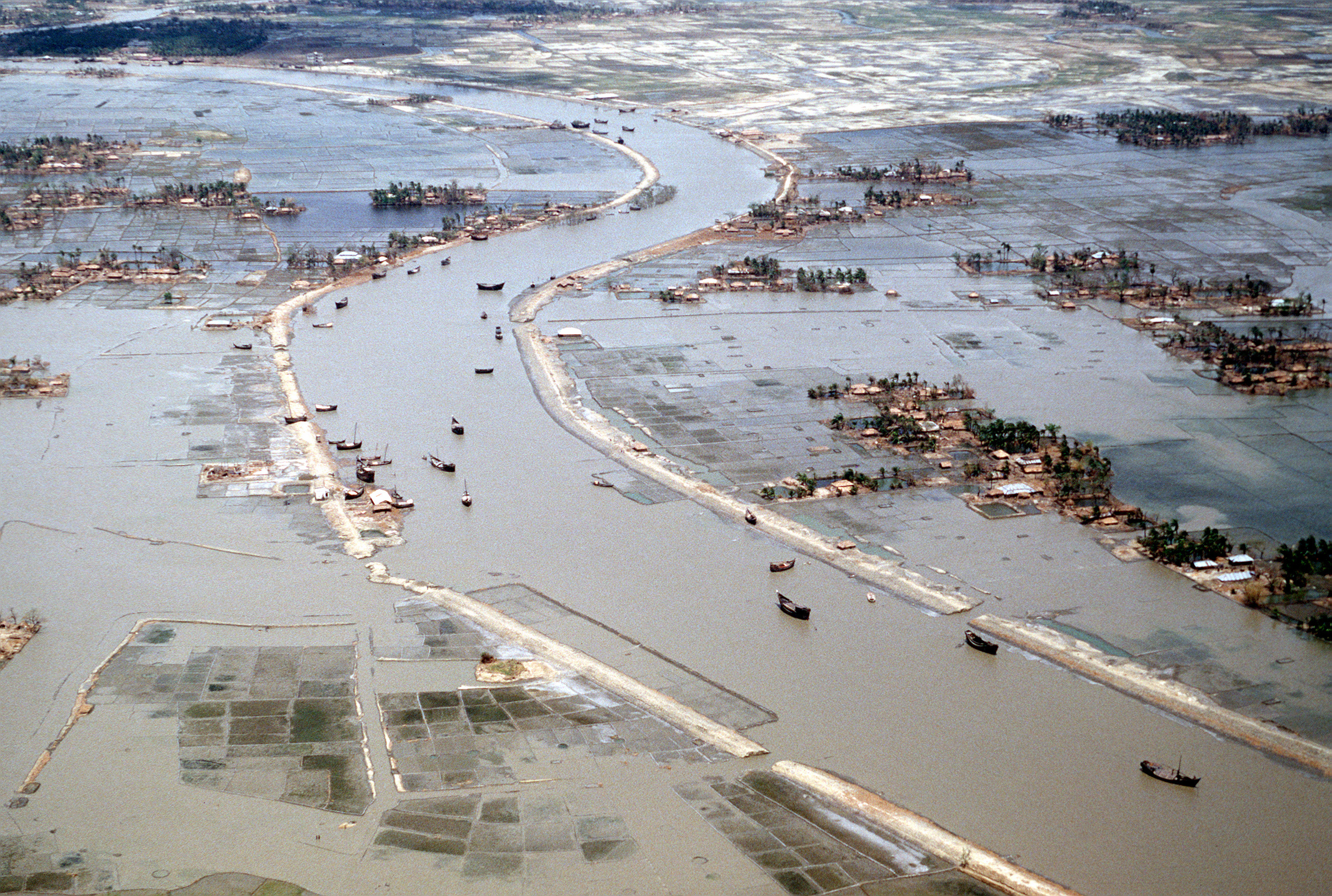
Flooding after the 1991 Bangladesh cyclone, which killed around 140,000 people

==== Climate change ====
Bangladesh is recognised to be one of the countries most vulnerable to climate change. Over the course of a century, 508 cyclones have affected the Bay of Bengal region, 17% of which are believed to have made landfall in Bangladesh. Natural hazards that come from increased rainfall, rising sea levels, and tropical cyclones are expected to increase as the climate changes, each seriously affecting agriculture, water and food security, human health, and shelter. It is estimated that by 2050, a three-foot rise in sea levels will inundate some 20% of the land and displace more than 30 million people. To address the sea level rise threat in Bangladesh, the Bangladesh Delta Plan 2100 has been launched.

=== Biodiversity ===
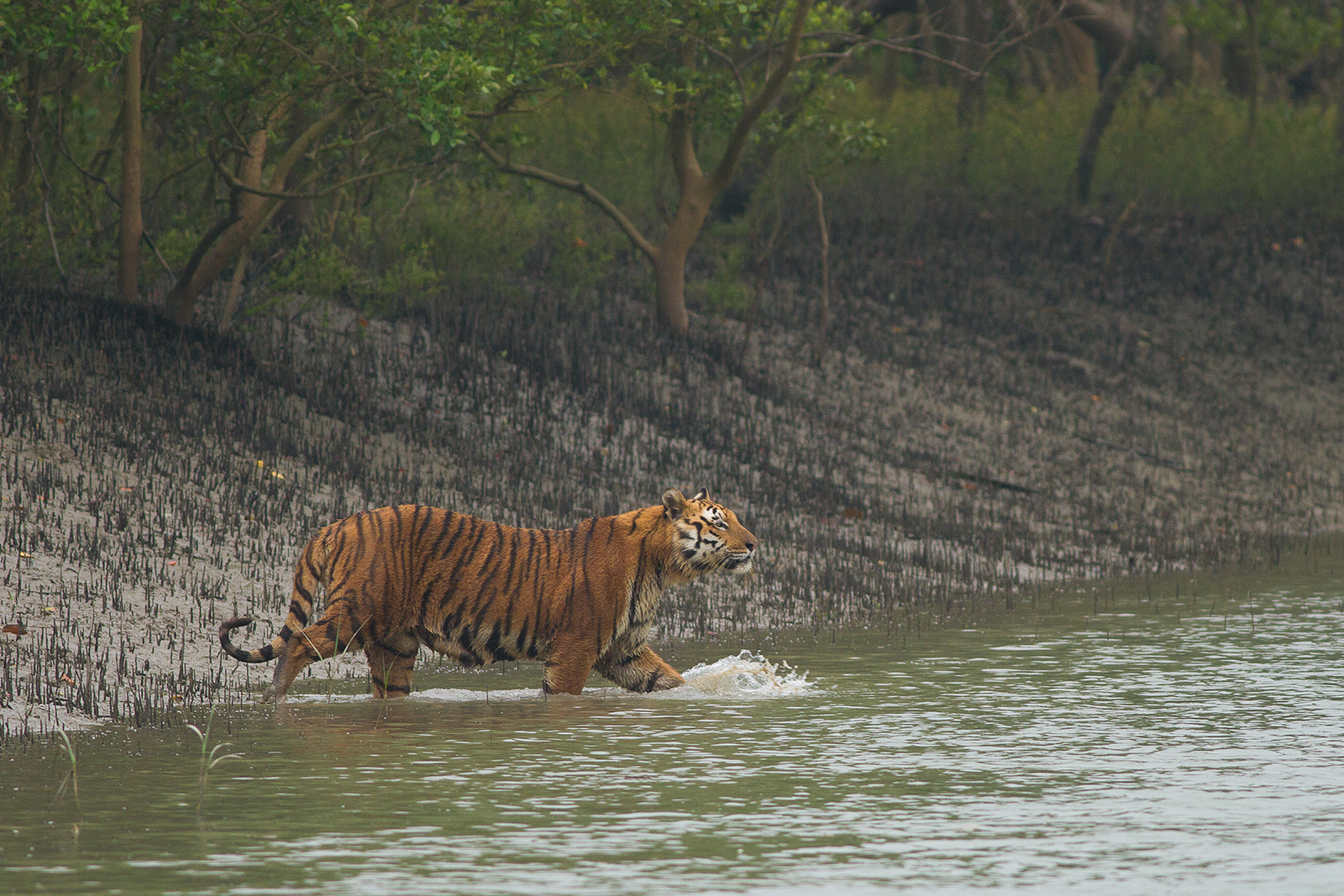
A Bengal tiger, the national animal, in the Sundarbans

Bangladesh is located in the Indomalayan realm, and lies within four terrestrial ecoregions: Lower Gangetic Plains moist deciduous forests, Mizoram–Manipur–Kachin rain forests, Sundarbans freshwater swamp forests, and Sundarbans mangroves. Its ecology includes a long sea coastline, numerous rivers and tributaries, lakes, wetlands, evergreen forests, semi evergreen forests, hill forests, moist deciduous forests, freshwater swamp forests and flat land with tall grass. The Bangladesh Plain is famous for its fertile alluvial soil which supports extensive cultivation. The country is dominated by lush vegetation, with villages often buried in groves of mango, jackfruit, bamboo, betel nut, coconut, and date palm. The country has up to 6000 species of plant life, including 5000 flowering plants. Water bodies and wetland systems provide a habitat for many aquatic plants. Water lilies and lotuses grow vividly during the monsoon season. The country has 60 wildlife sanctuaries.

Bangladesh is home to most of the Sundarbans, the world's largest mangrove forest, covering an area of 6,000 square kilometres (2,300 sq mi) in the southwest littoral region. It is divided into three protected sanctuaries: the South, East, and West zones. The forest is a UNESCO World Heritage Site. The northeastern Sylhet region is home to haor wetlands, a distinctive ecosystem. It also includes tropical and subtropical coniferous forests, a freshwater swamp forest, and mixed deciduous forests. The southeastern Chittagong region covers evergreen and semi-evergreen hilly jungles. Central Bangladesh includes the plainland Sal forest running along with the districts of Gazipur, Tangail, and Mymensingh. St. Martin's Island is the only coral reef in the country.

Bangladesh has an abundance of wildlife in its forests, marshes, woodlands, and hills. The vast majority of animals dwell within a habitat of 150,000 square kilometres (58,000 sq mi). The Bengal tiger, clouded leopard, saltwater crocodile, black panther and fishing cat are among the chief predators in the Sundarbans. Northern and eastern Bangladesh is home to the Asian elephant, hoolock gibbon, Asian black bear and oriental pied hornbill. The chital deer are widely seen in southwestern woodlands. Other animals include the black giant squirrel, capped langur, Bengal fox, sambar deer, jungle cat, king cobra, wild boar, mongooses, pangolins, pythons and water monitors. Bangladesh has one of the largest populations of Irrawaddy and Ganges dolphins. The country has numerous species of amphibians (53), reptiles (139), marine reptiles (19) and marine mammals (5). It also has 628 species of birds.

Several animals became extinct in Bangladesh during the last century, including the one-horned and two-horned rhinoceros and common peafowl. The human population is concentrated in urban areas, limiting deforestation to a certain extent. Rapid urban growth has threatened natural habitats. The country has widespread environmental issues; pollution of the Dhaleshwari River by the textile industry and shrimp cultivation in Chakaria Sundarbans have both been described by academics as ecocides. Although many areas are protected under law, some Bangladeshi wildlife is threatened by this growth. The Bangladesh Environment Conservation Act was enacted in 1995. The government has designated several regions as Ecologically Critical Areas, including wetlands, forests, and rivers. The Sundarbans tiger project and the Bangladesh Bear Project are among the key initiatives to strengthen conservation. It ratified the Rio Convention on Biological Diversity on 3 May 1994. As of 2014, the country was set to revise its National Biodiversity Strategy and Action Plan.

== Government and politics ==
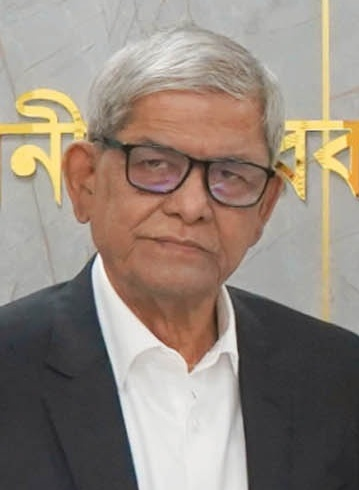
Mirza Fakhrul Islam Alamgir
President

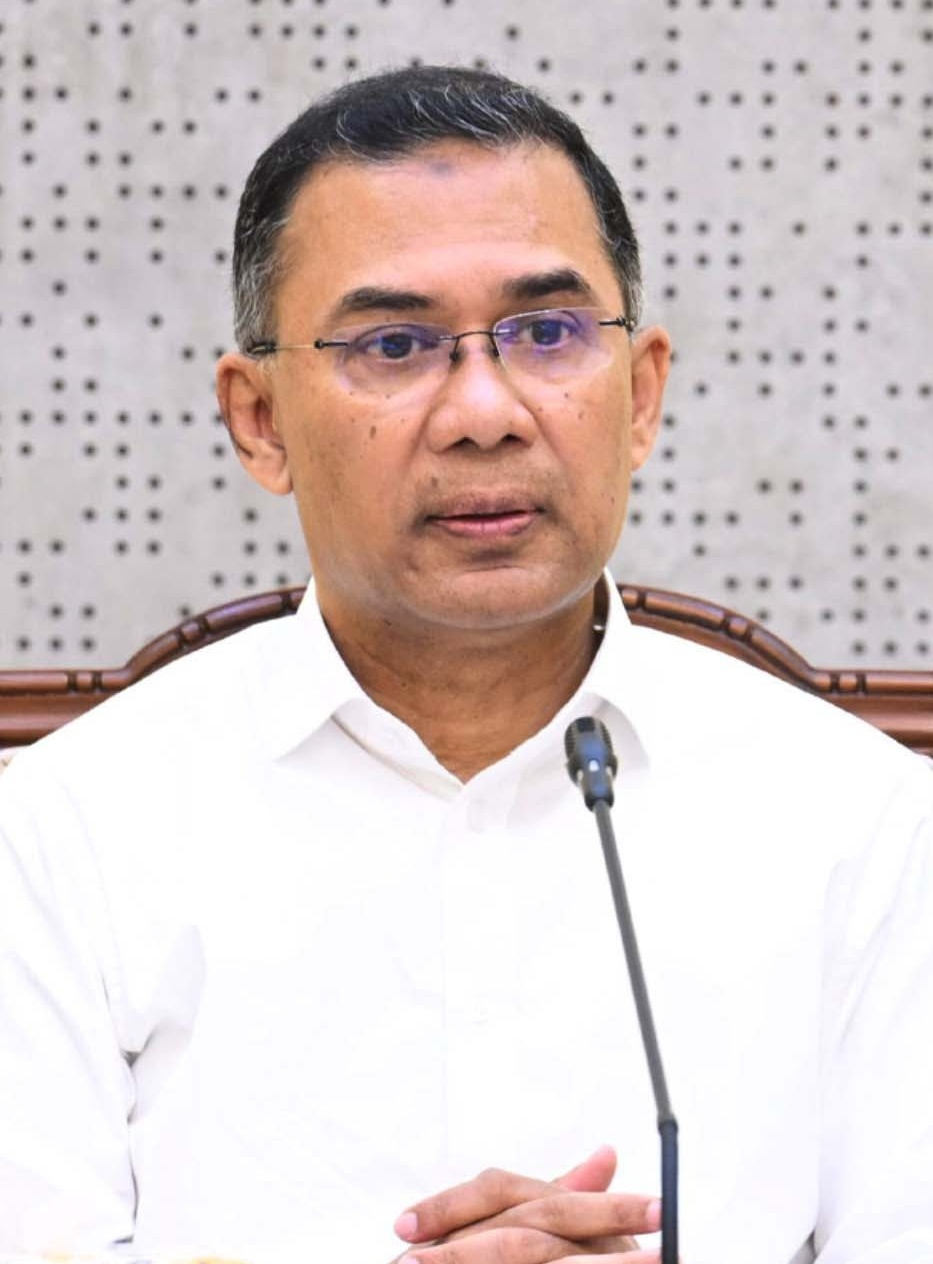
Tarique Rahman
Prime Minister

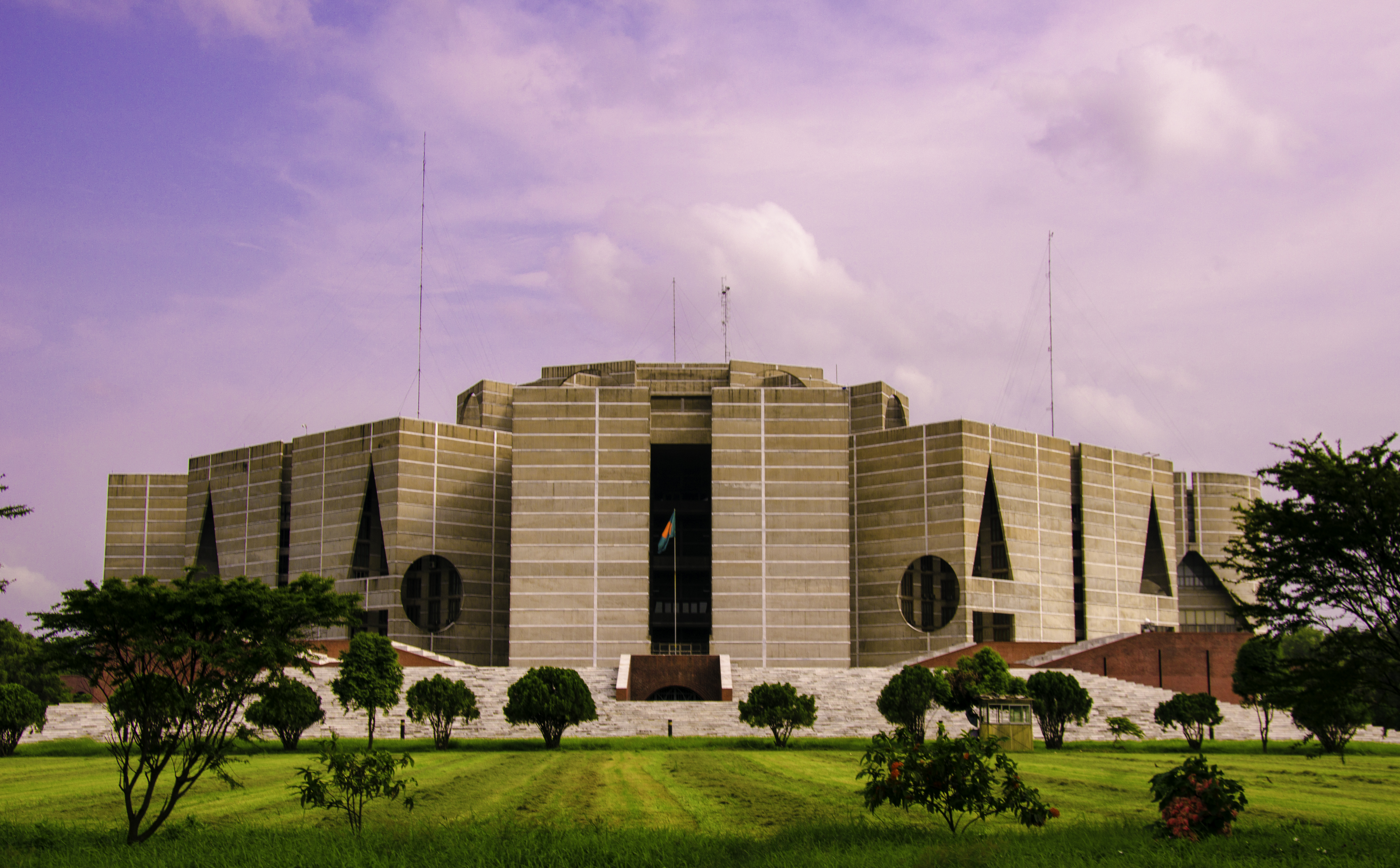
The National Parliament building in Sher-e-Bangla Nagar, a neighbourhood named after the first Prime Minister of Bengal

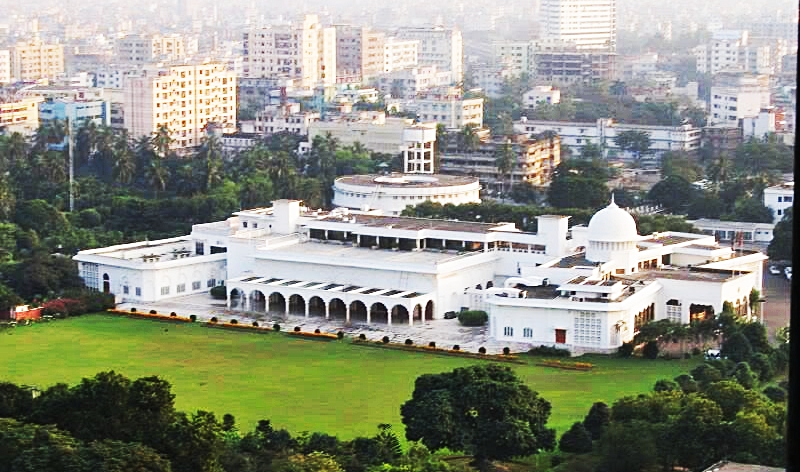
Bangabhaban (Translation: Bengal House) is the presidential palace of Bangladesh. It was originally a house for the Viceroy of India and the Governor of Bengal.

Bangladesh, by constitution, is a unitary state and a de jure representative democracy with a Westminster-style parliamentary system that has universal suffrage. The government can be divided into three pillars: the executive, the legislative and the judiciary. All function to ensure accountability, transparency and checks and balances. Since its independence, the Awami League (AL) and the Bangladesh Nationalist Party (BNP) have remained two of the most powerful political parties in Bangladesh.

- The first pillar of the government is the executive organ, which is entrusted with the administration of the country. Executive powers are largely vested in the Prime Minister, who is the head of government and oversees the cabinet. The tenure of a parliamentary government is five years. Various ministers form the bulk of the executive organ, overseeing government departments and forming policies. The Civil Service assists the ministers in implementing policy. All authorities unite to formulate policies, manage public services, and implement national development plans. The President is the ceremonial head of state, whose powers include signing bills passed by parliament into law, maintaining the government's stability and continuity, and fulfilling their duties as the commander-in-chief of the Armed Forces and the chancellor of all universities.
- The second pillar of the government is the legislative organ, also known as the Jatiya Sangsad (House of the Nation). Citizens elect the members of parliament (MPs). The unicameral parliament has 350 MPs, including 300 elected on the first past the post system and 50 appointed to reserved seats for women's empowerment. Article 70 of the Constitution of Bangladesh forbids MPs from voting against their party. The parliament is presided over by the Speaker, who is second in line to the president.
- The third pillar of the government is the judiciary organ, which is in charge of interpreting the law, resolving conflicts, and maintaining justice. The Supreme Court is the highest court, separated into the Appellate Division and the High Court Division. It is led by the Chief Justice. The judiciary has the power to assess a law's constitutionality and offer legal remedies. It protects citizens' rights, ensures the law is applied fairly, and preserves the balance of power within the government. The courts have wide latitude in judicial review, and judicial precedent is supported by Article 111 of the constitution. The judiciary includes district and metropolitan courts divided into civil and criminal courts. Due to a shortage of judges, the judiciary has a large backlog.

According to International IDEA's Global State of Democracy (GSoD) Indices and Democracy Tracker, Bangladesh performs in the low range on overall democratic measures, with particular weaknesses in political representation, including credible elections, inclusive suffrage and elected government.

=== Administrative divisions ===
A clickable map of Bangladesh exhibiting its divisions.

Bangladesh is divided into eight administrative divisions, each named after its headquarters: Barisal (officially Barishal), Chittagong (officially Chattogram), Dhaka, Khulna, Mymensingh, Rajshahi, Rangpur, and Sylhet.

Divisions are subdivided into districts (zila). Bangladesh has 64 districts, each subdivided into upazila (subdistricts) or thana. The area within each police station, except for those in metropolitan areas, is divided into unions, with each union comprising multiple villages. In the metropolitan areas, police stations are divided into wards, further divided into mahallas.

There are no elected officials at the divisional or district levels, and the administration comprises only government officials. Direct elections are held in each union (or ward) for a chairperson and several members. In 1997, Parliament passed legislation reserving three seats (out of 12) in every union for women.

Administrative Divisions of Bangladesh
Division	Capital	Established	Area (km^{2})	2021 Population (projected)	Density 2021
Barisal Division	Barisal	1 January 1993	13,225	9,713,000	734
Chittagong Division	Chittagong	1 January 1829	33,909	34,747,000	1,025
Dhaka Division	Dhaka	1 January 1829	20,594	42,607,000	2,069
Khulna Division	Khulna	1 October 1960	22,284	18,217,000	817
Mymensingh Division	Mymensingh	14 September 2015	10,584	13,457,000	1,271
Rajshahi Division	Rajshahi	1 January 1829	18,153	21,607,000	1,190
Rangpur Division	Rangpur	25 January 2010	16,185	18,868,000	1,166
Sylhet Division	Sylhet	1 August 1995	12,635	12,463,000	986

=== Foreign relations ===
Countries that share diplomatic relations with Bangladesh

Bangladesh is considered a middle power in global politics. It plays an important role in the geopolitical affairs of the Indo-Pacific, due to its strategic location between South and Southeast Asia. Bangladesh joined the Commonwealth of Nations in 1972 and the United Nations in 1974. It relies on multilateral diplomacy on issues like climate change, nuclear non-proliferation, trade policy and non-traditional security issues. Bangladesh pioneered the creation of SAARC, the preeminent forum for regional diplomacy on the Indian subcontinent. It joined the OIC in 1974, and is a founding member of the Developing-8. Recently, Bangladesh has focused on promoting regional trade and transport links with support from the World Bank. It is also attempting to join ASEAN as one of its top foreign policy goals. Dhaka hosts the headquarters of BIMSTEC, an organisation that brings together countries dependent on the Bay of Bengal.

Relations with neighbouring Myanmar have been severely strained since 2016–2017, after over 700,000 Rohingya refugees fled into Bangladesh. Bangladesh's parliament, government, and civil society have been at the forefront of international criticism against Myanmar for military operations against the Rohingya, and have demanded their right of return to Arakan.

Bangladesh shares an important bilateral and economic relationship with its largest neighbour, India, which is often strained by water politics of the Ganges and the Teesta, and the border killings of Bangladeshi civilians. Bangladesh's relationship with Pakistan is problematic, mainly because Pakistan denies the 1971 Bangladesh genocide. It maintains a warm relationship with China, its largest trading partner and largest arms supplier. Japan is Bangladesh's largest economic aid provider, and the two have a strategic and economic partnership. Political relations with Middle Eastern countries are robust. Bangladesh receives 59% of its remittances from the Middle East, despite poor working conditions affecting over four million Bangladeshi workers. Bangladesh plays a major role in global climate diplomacy as a leader of the Climate Vulnerable Forum.

=== Military ===
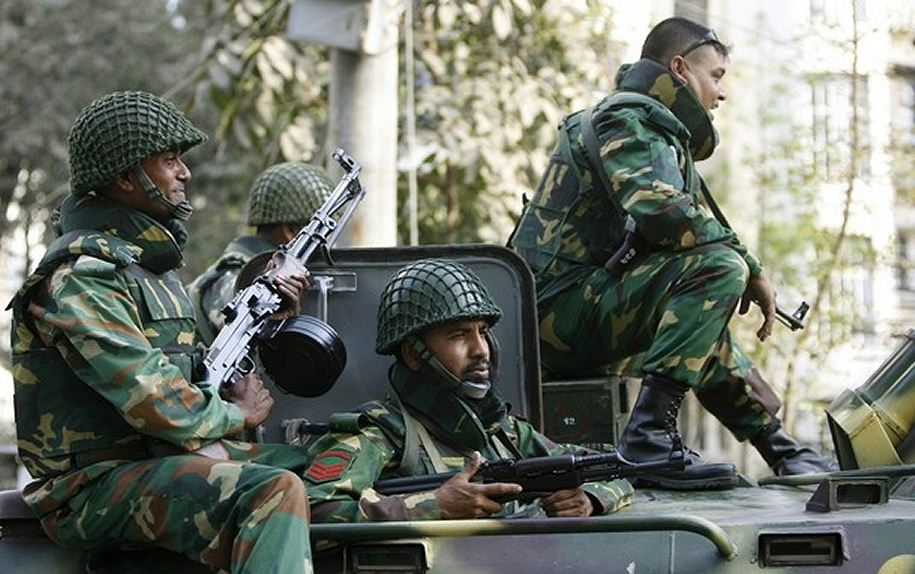
Bangladesh Army personnel on a BTR-80

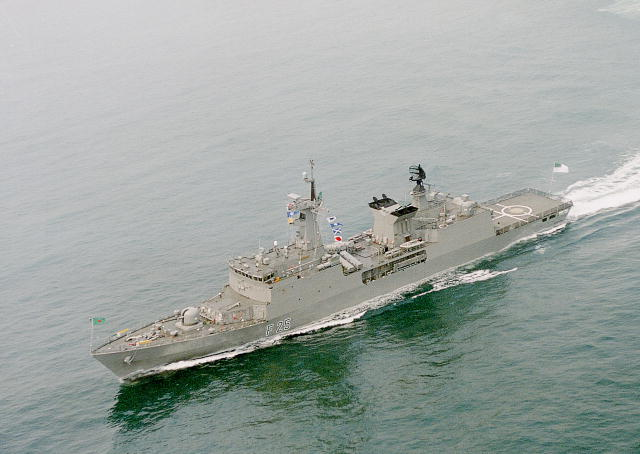
Bangladesh Navy Frigate, BNS Khalid Bin Walid

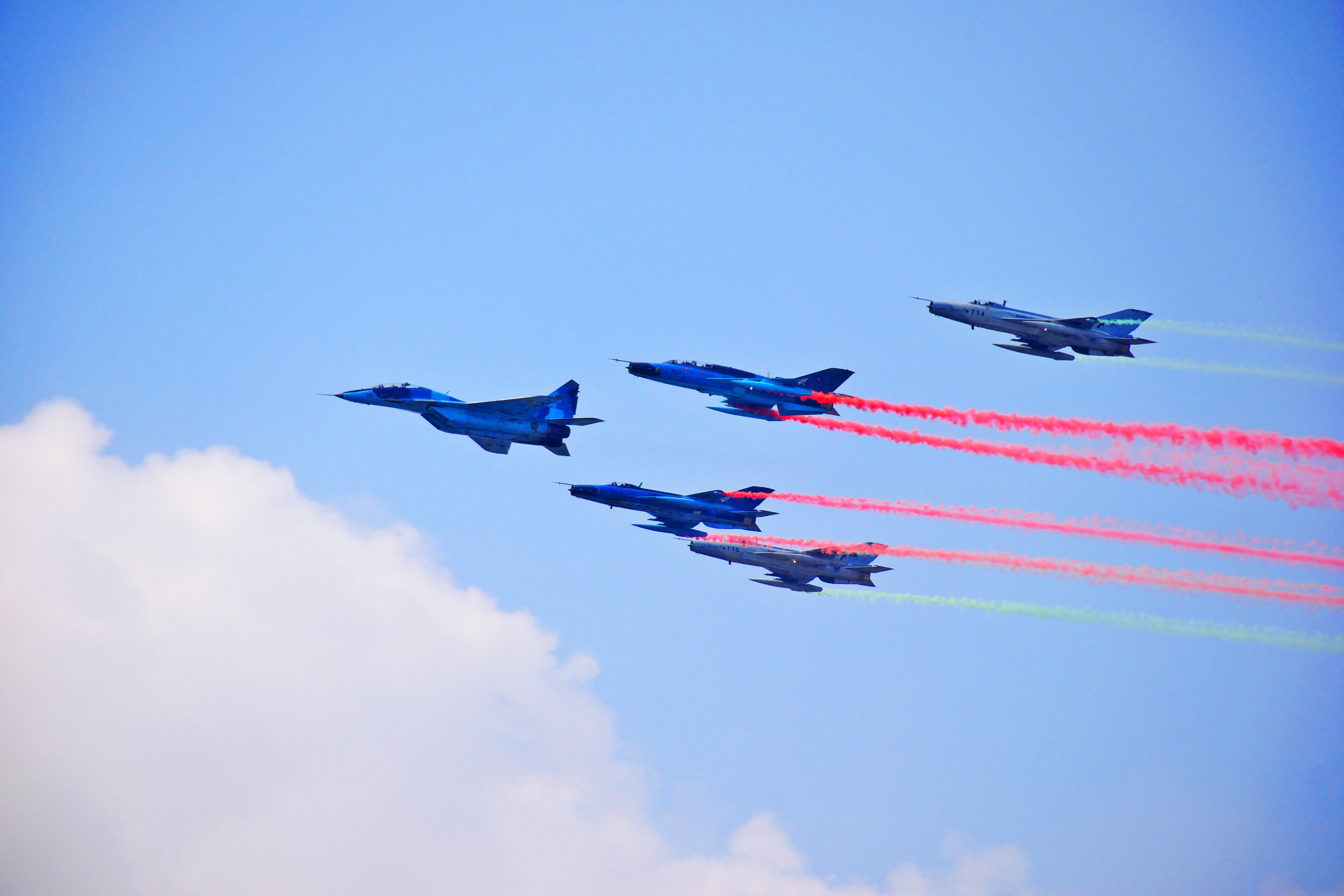
Mig-29 and F-7, Fighter aircraft's of Bangladesh Air Force

The Bangladesh Armed Forces have inherited the institutional framework of the British military and the British Indian Army. In 2024, the active personnel strength of the Bangladesh Armed Forces was around 230,000, including the Air Force (21,000) and the Navy (27,000). In addition to traditional defence roles, the military has supported civil authorities in disaster relief and provided internal security during periods of political unrest. For many years, Bangladesh has been the world's largest contributor to UN peacekeeping forces. The military budget of Bangladesh accounts for 1.3% of GDP, amounting to US$4.3 billion in 2021.

The Bangladesh Navy, one of the largest in the Bay of Bengal, includes a fleet of frigates, submarines, corvettes, and other vessels. The Bangladesh Air Force has a small fleet of multi-role combat aircraft. Most of Bangladesh's military equipment comes from China. In recent years, Bangladesh and India have increased joint military exercises, high-level visits of military leaders, counter-terrorism cooperation and intelligence sharing. Bangladesh is vital to ensuring stability and security in northeast India.

Bangladesh's strategic importance in the eastern subcontinent hinges on its proximity to China, its frontier with Burma, the separation of mainland and northeast India, and its maritime territory in the Bay of Bengal. In 2002, Bangladesh and China signed a Defense Cooperation Agreement. The United States has pursued negotiations with Bangladesh on a Status of forces agreement, an Acquisition and Cross-Servicing Agreement and a General Security of Military Information Agreement. In 2019, Bangladesh ratified the UN Treaty on the Prohibition of Nuclear Weapons.

=== Civil society ===
Since the colonial period, Bangladesh has had a prominent civil society. There are various special interest groups, including non-governmental organisations, human rights organisations, professional associations, chambers of commerce, employers' associations, and trade unions. The National Human Rights Commission of Bangladesh was set up in 2007. Notable human rights organisations and initiatives include the Centre for Law and Mediation, Odhikar, the Alliance for Bangladesh Worker Safety, the Bangladesh Environmental Lawyers Association, the Bangladesh Hindu Buddhist Christian Unity Council and the War Crimes Fact Finding Committee. The world's largest international NGO BRAC is based in Bangladesh. There has been concern about the shrinking space for independent civil society in recent years.

=== Human rights ===
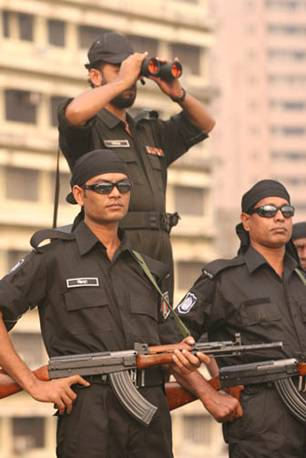
The Rapid Action Battalion (RAB) have been widely accused of extrajudicial killings, enforced disappearances and human right abuses. The United States Department of the Treasury sanctioned RAB in 2021.

Torture is banned by the Constitution of Bangladesh, but is rampantly used by Bangladesh's security forces. Bangladesh joined the Convention against Torture in 1998 and enacted its first anti-torture law, the Torture and Custodial Death (Prevention) Act, in 2013. The first conviction under this law was announced in 2020. Amnesty International Prisoners of Conscience from Bangladesh have included Saber Hossain Chowdhury and Shahidul Alam. The widely criticised Digital Security Act was repealed and replaced by the Cyber Security Act in 2023. The repeal was welcomed by the International Press Institute.

On International Human Rights Day in December 2021, the United States Department of the Treasury announced sanctions on commanders of the Rapid Action Battalion for extrajudicial killings, torture, and other human rights abuses. Freedom House has criticised the government for human rights abuses, the crackdown on the opposition, mass media, and civil society through politicised enforcement. Bangladesh is ranked "partly free" in Freedom House's Freedom in the World report, but its press freedom has deteriorated from "free" to "not free" in recent years due to increasing government pressure. According to the British Economist Intelligence Unit, the country has a hybrid regime: the third of four rankings in its Democracy Index. Bangladesh ranked 96th among 163 countries in the 2022 Global Peace Index. According to National Human Rights Commission, 70% of alleged human-rights violations are committed by law-enforcement agencies.

LGBT rights are frowned upon among social conservatives. Homosexuality is affected by Section 377 of the Penal Code of Bangladesh, originally enacted by the British colonial government. The government only recognises the transgender and intersex community known as the Hijra. According to the 2023 Global Slavery Index, an estimated 1.2 million people were enslaved in Bangladesh as of 2021, which is among the highest in the world.

=== Corruption ===
Like many developing countries, institutional corruption is an issue of concern for Bangladesh. Bangladesh ranked 146th among 180 countries on Transparency International's 2018 Corruption Perceptions Index. Land administration was the sector with the most bribery in 2015, followed by education, police and water supply. The Anti Corruption Commission was formed in 2004, and was active during the 2006–2008 Bangladeshi political crisis, indicting many leading politicians, bureaucrats and businessmen for graft.

== Economy ==
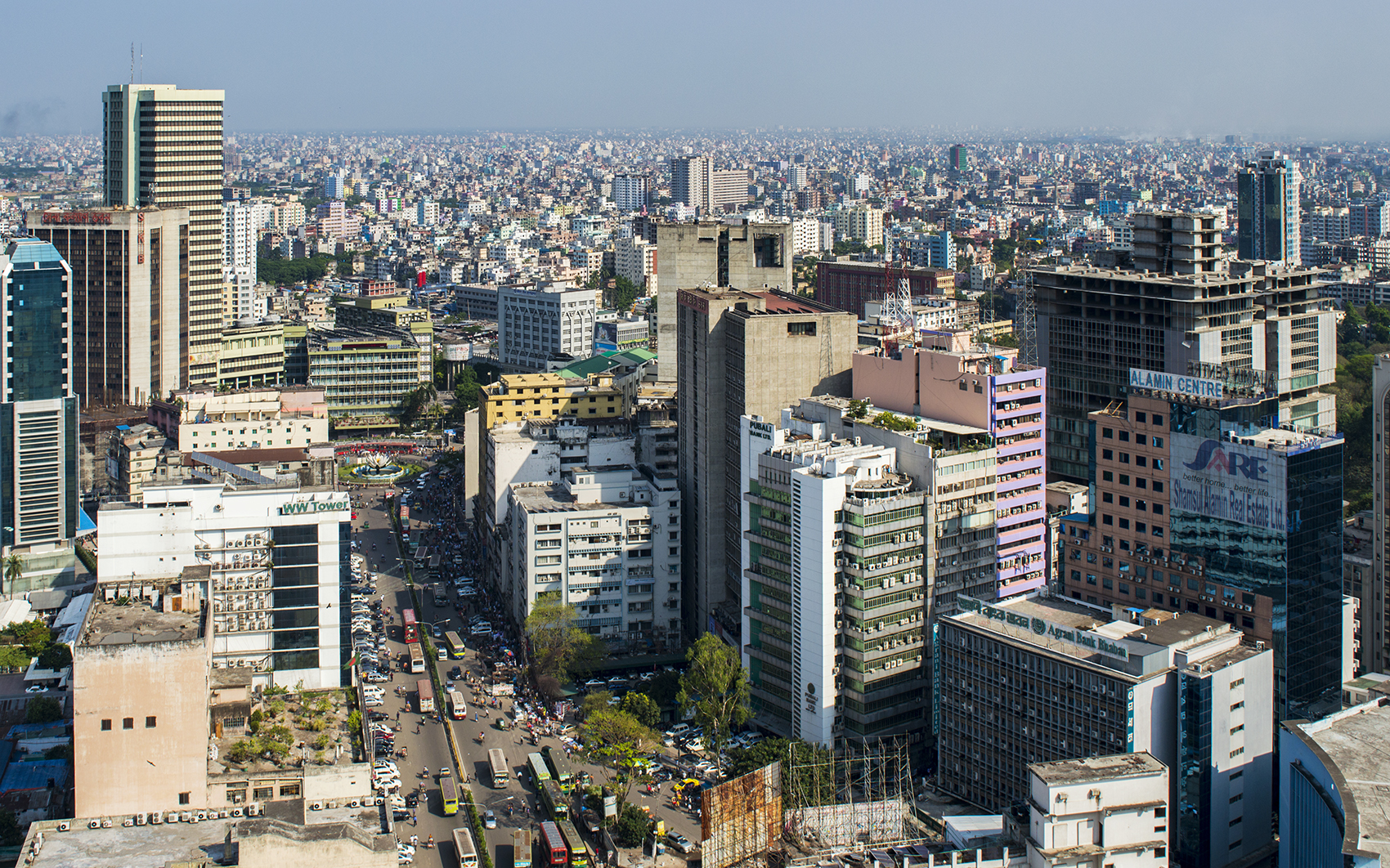
Motijheel in the nation's capital Dhaka is the largest commercial district in the city.

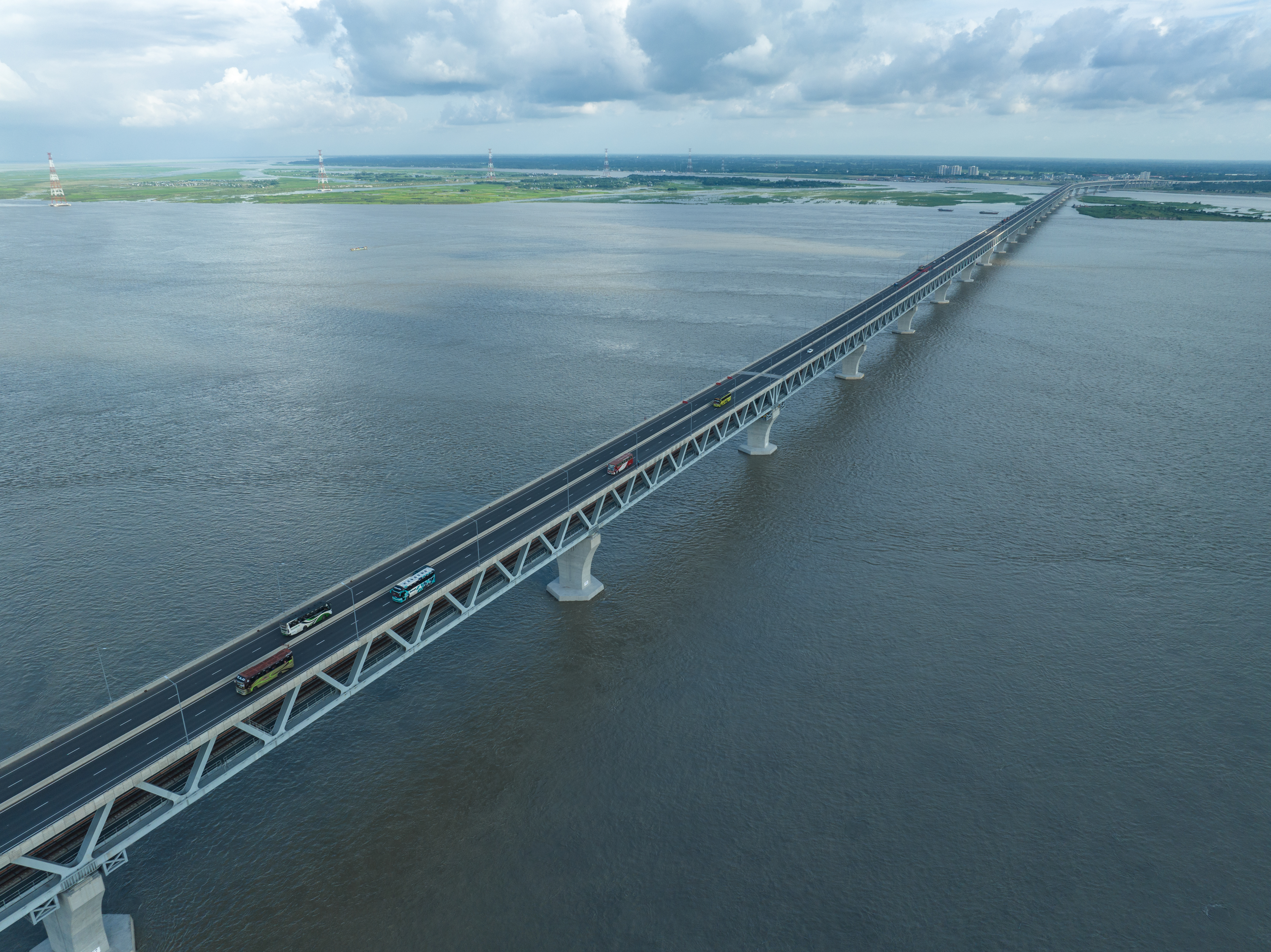
The Padma Bridge, opened in 2022, is a road-rail bridge which spans the Padma River.

Bangladesh is a lower-middle income mixed-market economy. It has the world's 36th-largest economy by nominal terms, and the 25th-largest by PPP. Bangladesh has a labour force of 71.4 million, which is the world's seventh-largest, with an unemployment rate of 3.6% as of 2024. Its foreign exchange reserves, although depleting, remain the second-highest in South Asia, after India. Bangladesh's large diaspora contributed roughly $27 billion in remittances in 2024. The Bangladeshi taka is the national currency.

As of 2023, the large service sector accounts for about 51.5% of total GDP, followed by the industrial sector (34.6%), while the agriculture sector is by far the smallest, making up only 11% of total GDP. Although it is the largest employment sector, it provides roughly half of the total workforce. Over 84% of the export earnings come from the textile industry. Bangladesh is the second-leading garments exporter in the world, and supplies the global fast fashion industry, exporting to various Western fashion brands. It is also a major producer of jute, rice, fish, tea, and flowers. Other major industries include shipbuilding, pharmaceuticals, steel, electronics and leather goods. China is the largest trading partner of Bangladesh, accounting for 15% of the total trade, followed by India, which accounts for 8% of the total trade.

The private sector accounts for 80% of GDP compared to the dwindling role of state-owned companies. Bangladesh's economy is dominated by family-owned conglomerates and small and medium-sized businesses. Some of the largest publicly traded companies in Bangladesh include BEXIMCO, BRAC Bank, BSRM, GPH Ispat, Grameenphone, Summit Group, and Square Pharmaceuticals. The Dhaka and Chittagong Stock Exchanges are the country's twin capital markets. Its telecommunications industry is one of the world's fastest growing, with 188.78 million cellphone subscribers at the end of November 2024. Political instability, high inflation, endemic corruption, insufficient power supplies, and slow implementation of reforms are major challenges to economic growth.

Bangladesh was ranked 106th in the Global Innovation Index in 2024 and in 2025.

=== Energy ===
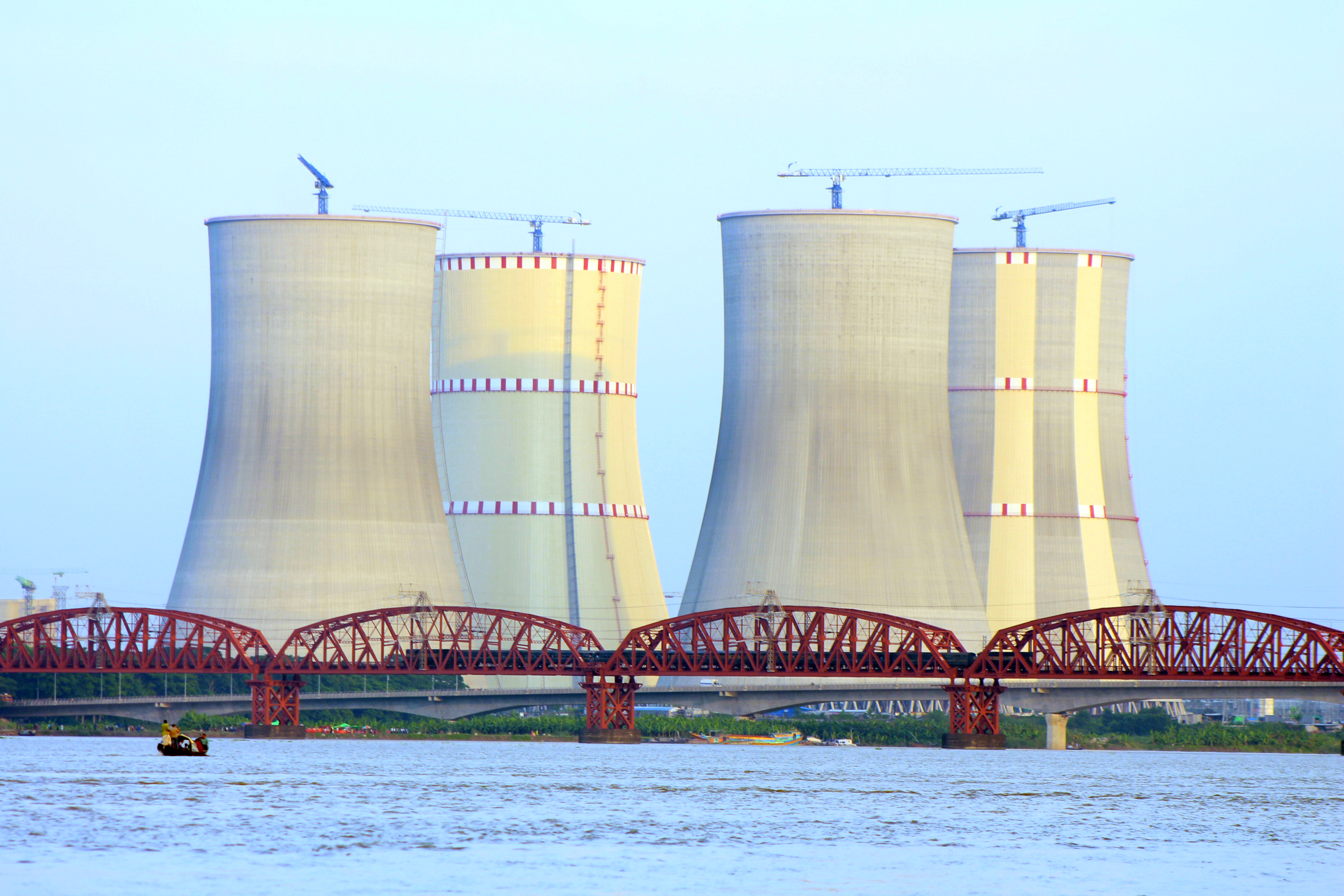
The under-construction Rooppur Nuclear Power Plant

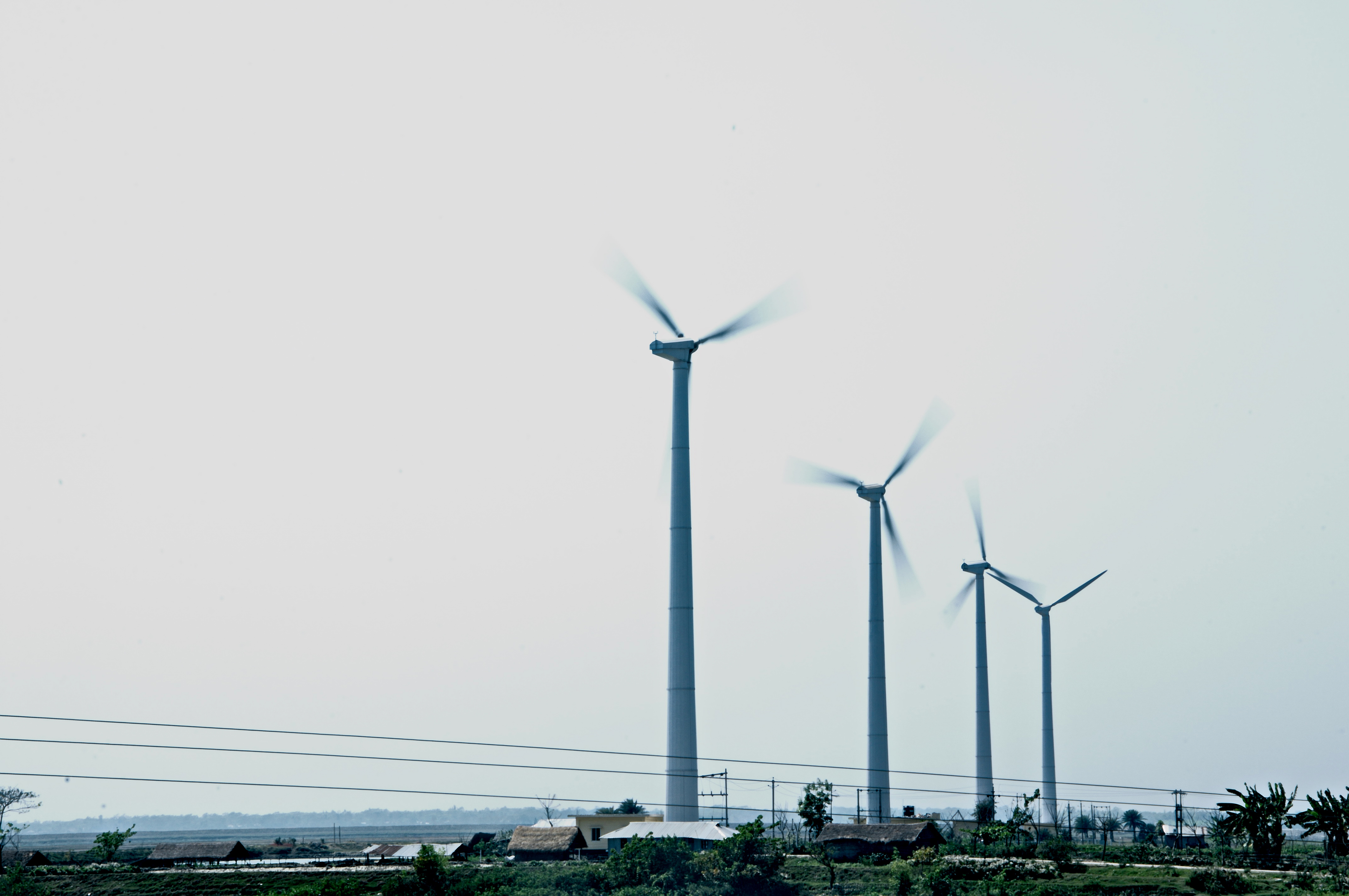
Wind turbines on Kutubdia Island

Bangladesh, a country experiencing daily blackouts several times a day in 2009, achieved 100% electrification by 2022. It is gradually transitioning to a green economy and has the largest off-grid solar power programme in the world, benefiting 20 million people. An electric car called the Palki is being developed for production in the country. Biogas is being used to produce organic fertiliser. The under-construction Rooppur Nuclear Power Plant, under-construction with assistance from the Russian company Rosatom, will be the first operational nuclear power plant in the country. Its first unit, out of the two total units, is expected to go into operation in 2025.

Bangladesh continues to have huge untapped reserves of natural gas, particularly in its maritime territory. A lack of exploration and decreasing proven reserves have forced Bangladesh to import LNG from abroad. Gas shortages were further exacerbated by the Russo-Ukrainian war. Bangladesh stopped buying spot price LNG temporarily in July 2022, despite constant load-shedding, due to a steep price hike in the global market. It restarted buying spot price LNG once again in February 2023 as prices eased.

While government-owned companies in Bangladesh generate nearly half of Bangladesh's electricity, privately owned companies like the Summit Group and Orion Group are playing an increasingly important role in both generating electricity, and supplying machinery, reactors, and equipment. Bangladesh increased electricity production capacity from 5 gigawatts in 2009 to 25.5 gigawatts in 2022. It plans to further increase it to 50 gigawatts by 2041. US companies like Chevron and General Electric supply around 55% of Bangladesh's domestic natural gas production and are among the largest investors in power projects. 80% of Bangladesh's installed gas-fired power generation capacity comes from turbines manufactured in the United States.

=== Tourism ===
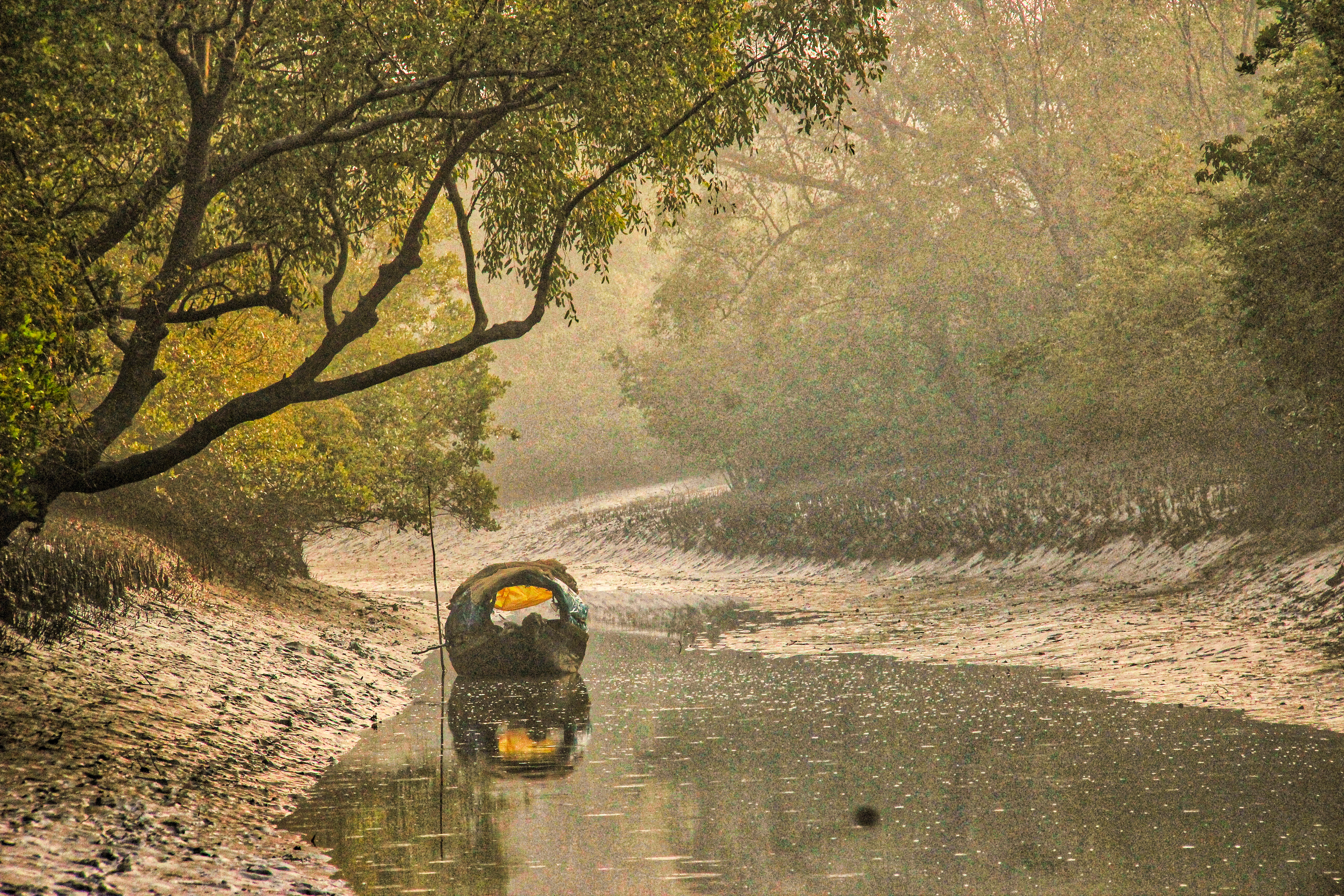
The Sundarbans is the largest mangrove forest in the world.

The tourism industry is expanding, contributing some 3.02% of total GDP. Bangladesh's international tourism receipts in 2019 amounted to $391 million. The country has three UNESCO World Heritage Sites (the Mosque City, the Buddhist Vihara and the Sundarbans) and seven tentative-list sites. The World Travel and Tourism Council (WTTC) reported in 2019 that the travel and tourism industry in Bangladesh directly generated 1,180,500 jobs in 2018 or 1.9% of the country's total employment. According to the same report, Bangladesh experiences around 125,000 international tourist arrivals per year. Domestic spending generated 97.7% of direct travel and tourism gross domestic product (GDP) in 2012.

== Demographics ==
Population (millions)
Year	Pop.	±% p.a.
1960	51,828,660	—
1971	70,276,758	+2.81%
1980	88,016,432	+2.53%
1990	111,633,717	+2.41%
2000	134,544,304	+1.88%
2010	152,201,981	+1.24%
2023	171,466,990	+0.92%
Source: World Bank

Bangladesh had a recorded population of 169.8 million in the 2022 census, which rose to 175.4 million as of 2026. It is the eighth-most-populous country in the world, the fifth-most populous country in Asia, and the most densely populated large country in the world, with a headline population density of 1,265 people/km^{2} as of 2020. Bangladesh's total fertility rate (TFR), once among the highest in the world, has experienced a dramatic decline, from 5.5 in 1985 to 3.7 in 1995, down to 1.9 in 2022, which is below the sub-replacement fertility of 2.1. Most of the population lives in rural areas, with only 40% of the population living in urban areas as of 2023. Bangladesh has a median age of roughly 28 years, with 26% of the total population aged 14 or younger, and 6% aged 65 and above as of 2023.

Bangladesh is an ethnically and culturally homogeneous society, as Bengalis form 99% of the population. The Adivasi population includes the Chakmas, Marmas, Santhals, Mros, Tanchangyas, Bawms, Tripuris, Khasis, Khumis, Kukis, Garos, and Bisnupriya Manipuris. The Chittagong Hill Tracts region experienced unrest and an insurgency from 1975 to 1997 in an autonomy movement by its indigenous people. Although a peace accord was signed in 1997, the region remains militarised. Urdu-speaking stranded Pakistanis were given citizenship by the Supreme Court in 2008. Bangladesh also hosts over 700,000 Rohingya refugees since 2017, giving it one of the largest refugee populations in the world.

=== Urban centres ===
Dhaka is Bangladesh's capital and largest city. It is administered by two city corporations covering the northern and southern parts of the city. There are 13 city corporations whose mayors are elected for five-year terms: Dhaka South, Dhaka North, Chittagong, Comilla, Khulna, Mymensingh, Sylhet, Rajshahi, Barisal, Rangpur, Gazipur, Bogura and Narayanganj. The 2022 census recorded 506 urban centres, including 43 cities with populations above 100,000.

Largest cities or towns in Bangladesh
Rank	Name	Pop.	Rank	Name	Pop.
1	Dhaka	10,278,882	11	Comilla	439,414
2	Chittagong	3,227,246
3	Gazipur	2,674,697
4	Narayanganj	967,724
5	Khulna	718,735
6	Rangpur	708,384
7	Mymensingh	576,722
8	Rajshahi	552,791
9	Sylhet	532,426
10	Bogura	542,420

=== Language ===
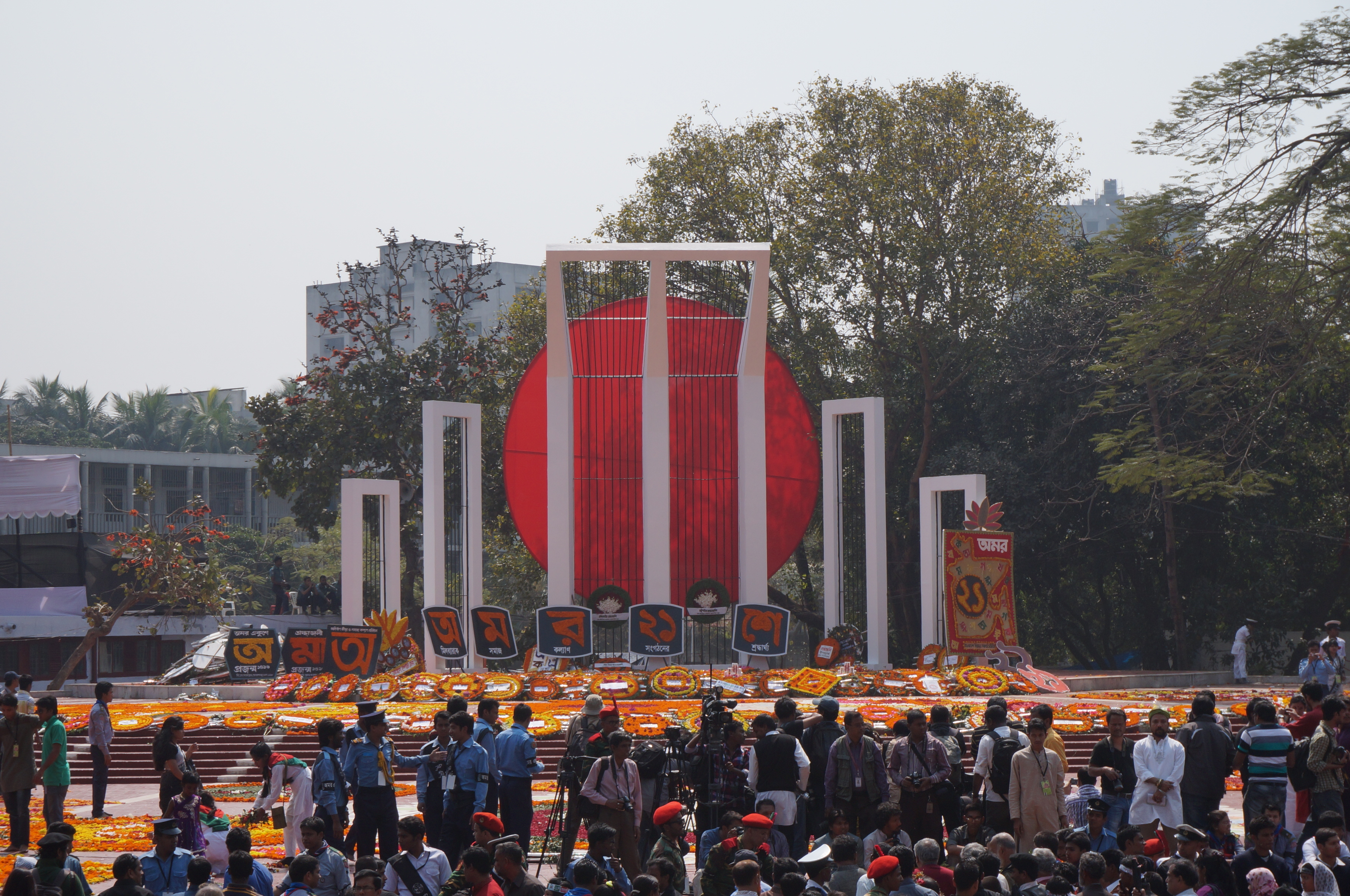
The Shaheed Minar, a national monument in Dhaka established to commemorate the martyrs of the 1952 Bengali language movement, is a symbol of Bengali nationalism.

The official and predominant language of Bangladesh is Bengali, which is spoken by more than 99% of the population as their native language. Bengali is described as a dialect continuum where there are various dialects spoken throughout the country. There is a diglossia in which much of the population can understand or speak in Standard Colloquial Bengali, and in their regional dialect or language variety. These include Chittagonian which is spoken in the southeastern region of Chittagong, Noakhali spoken in the southern district of Noakhali and Sylheti spoken in the northeastern region of Sylhet.

English plays an important role in Bangladesh's judicial and educational affairs, due to the country's history as part of the British Empire. It is widely spoken and commonly understood, and is taught as a compulsory subject in all schools, colleges and universities, while the English-medium educational system is widely attended.

Tribal languages, although increasingly endangered, include the Chakma language, another native Eastern Indo-Aryan language, spoken by the Chakma people. Others are Garo, Meitei, Kokborok and Rakhine. Among the Austroasiatic languages, the most spoken is the Santali language, native to the Santal people. The stranded Pakistanis and some sections of the Old Dhakaites often use Urdu as their native tongue. Still, the usage of the latter remains highly reproached.

=== Religion ===
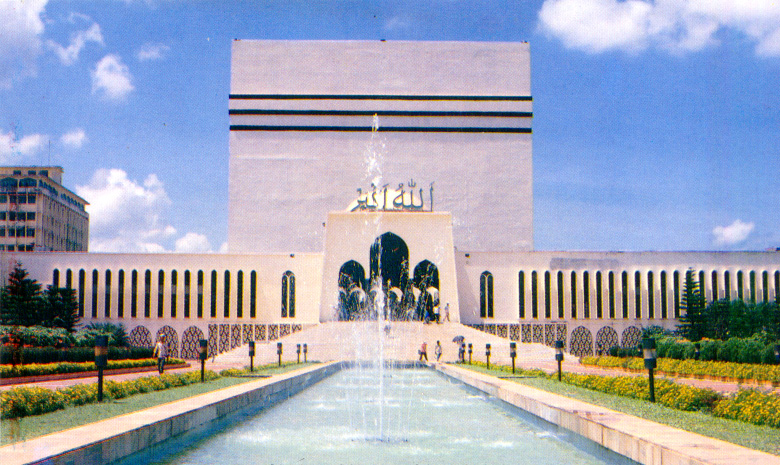
Baitul Mukarram National Mosque, the largest and national mosque of Bangladesh

Islam is the state religion of Bangladesh. However, the constitution also upholds secularism and ensures equal rights for all religions. Every citizen has the freedom to practice any religion.

Islam is the largest religion in the country, followed by about 91% of the population. The vast majority of Bangladeshi citizens are Bengali Muslims, adhering to Sunni Islam. The country is the third-most populous Muslim-majority state in the world and has the fourth-largest overall Muslim population.

Bengali Hindus form the country's largest religious minority and the third-largest Hindu community in the world. According to the 2022 census Hindus form 7.95% of the total population. In the 2011 census, Hindus formed 8.54% of the population.

Buddhism is the third-most followed religion, adhered to by 0.6% of the population. Bangladeshi Buddhists are concentrated among the tribal ethnic groups in the Chittagong Hill Tracts and by the Bengali Buddhist minority across coastal Chittagong, who mostly follow the Theravada school.

Christianity is the fourth-largest religion at 0.3%, followed mainly by a small Bengali Christian minority. 0.1% of the population practices other religions such as Animism or is irreligious.

=== Education ===
The literacy rate of the districts of Bangladesh

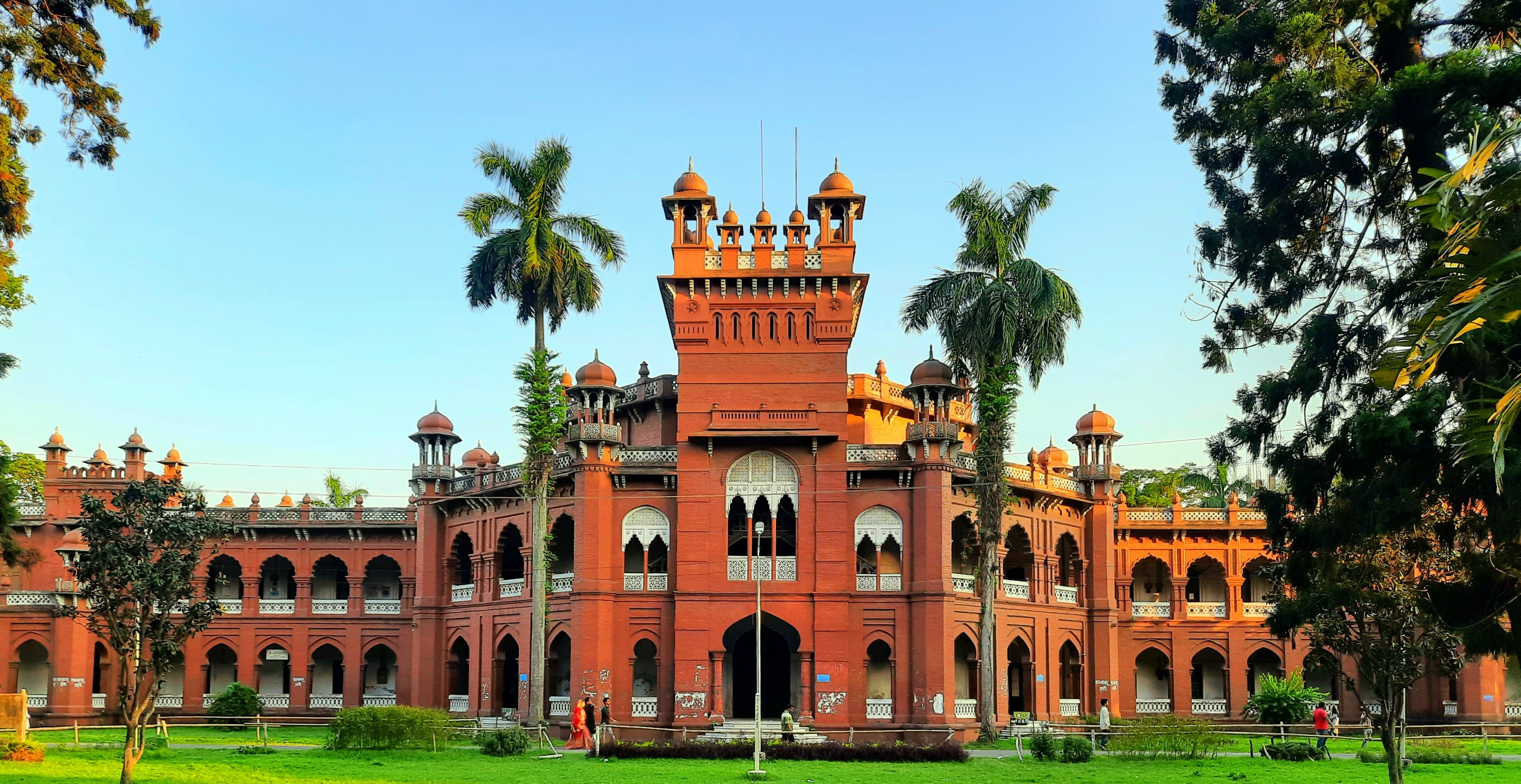
Curzon Hall of the University of Dhaka

The constitution states that all children shall receive free and compulsory education. Education in Bangladesh is overseen by the Ministry of Education. The Ministry of Primary and Mass Education is responsible for implementing policy for primary education and state-funded schools at a local level. Primary and secondary education is compulsory, and is financed by the state and free of charge in public schools. Bangladesh has a literacy rate of 76% as of 2021: 79% for males and 71.9% for females. Its educational system is three-tiered and heavily subsidised, with the government operating many schools at the primary, secondary and higher secondary levels and subsidising many private schools. However, government expenditure in education remains among the lowest in the world, at only 1.8% of the total GDP.

The education system is divided into five levels: primary (first to fifth grade), junior secondary (sixth to eighth grade), secondary (ninth and tenth grade), higher secondary (11th and 12th grade), and tertiary which is university level. Primary level students have to pass the Primary Education Completion (PEC) exam to proceed to junior secondary. The junior secondary students then give the Junior School Certificate (JSC) exam to get enrolled in ninth grade, while tenth-grade students have to pass the Secondary School Certificate (SSC) exam to proceed to eleventh grade. Lastly, students have to pass the Higher Secondary Certificate (HSC) exam at grade twelve to apply for higher education or universities.

Universities are three general types: public (government-owned and funded by the University Grants Commission), private (privately owned universities) and international (operated and funded by international organisations). The country has 55 public, 115 private and 2 international universities. National University is the second-largest university in the world by enrolment. The University of Dhaka, established in 1921, is the oldest public university. BUET is the premiere university for engineering education. The University of Chittagong, established in 1966, has the largest campus. Dhaka College, established in 1841, is among the oldest educational institutes in the Indian subcontinent. Medical education is provided by 39 government, 6 armed force and 68 private medical colleges. All medical colleges are affiliated with the Ministry of Health and Family Welfare.

=== Health ===
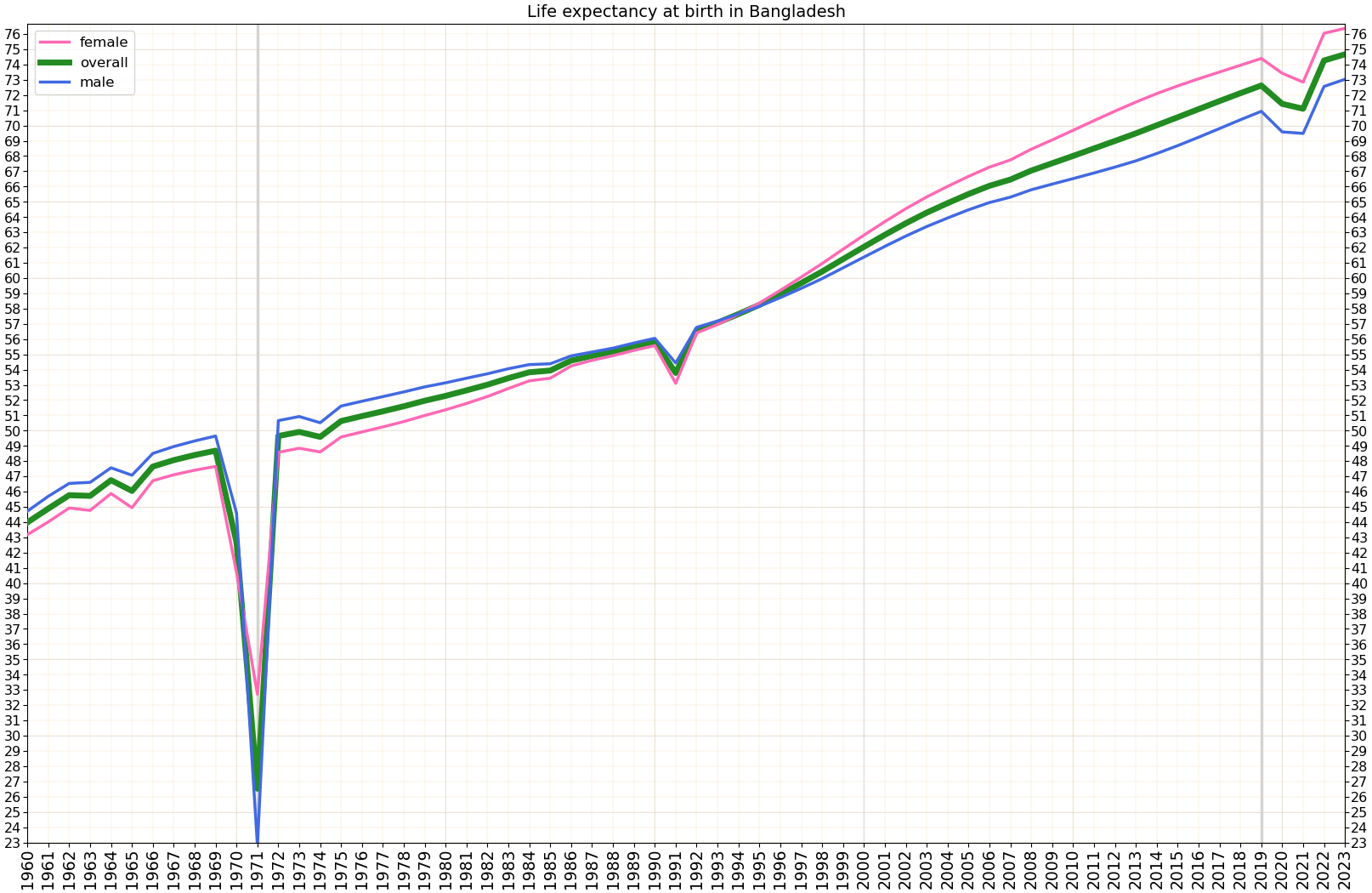
Historical development of life expectancy in Bangladesh, displaying significant strides since independence

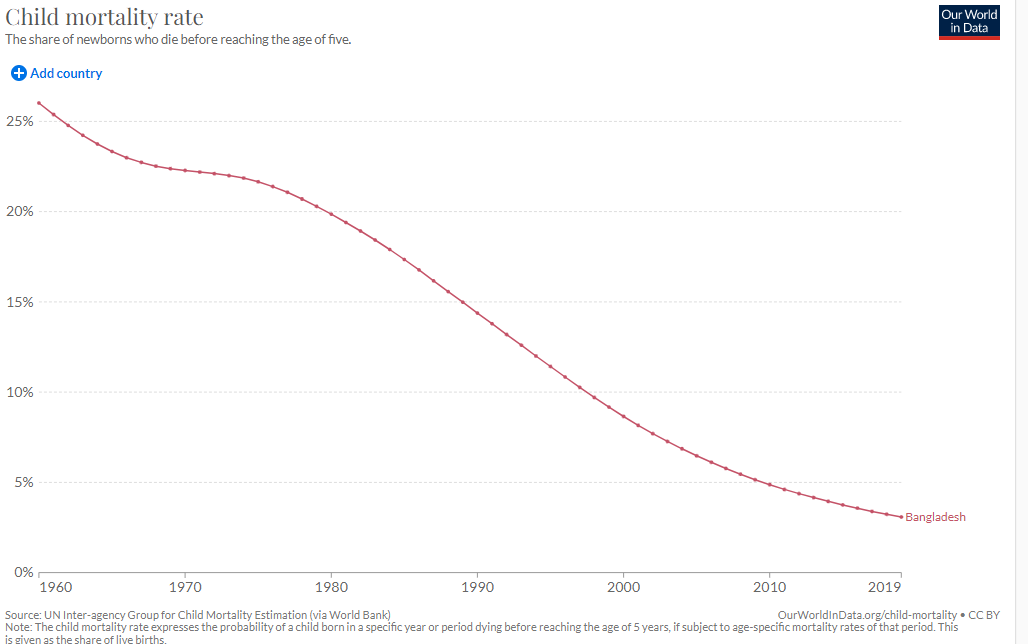
Historical development of child mortality in Bangladesh since 1990, showing a significant decrease

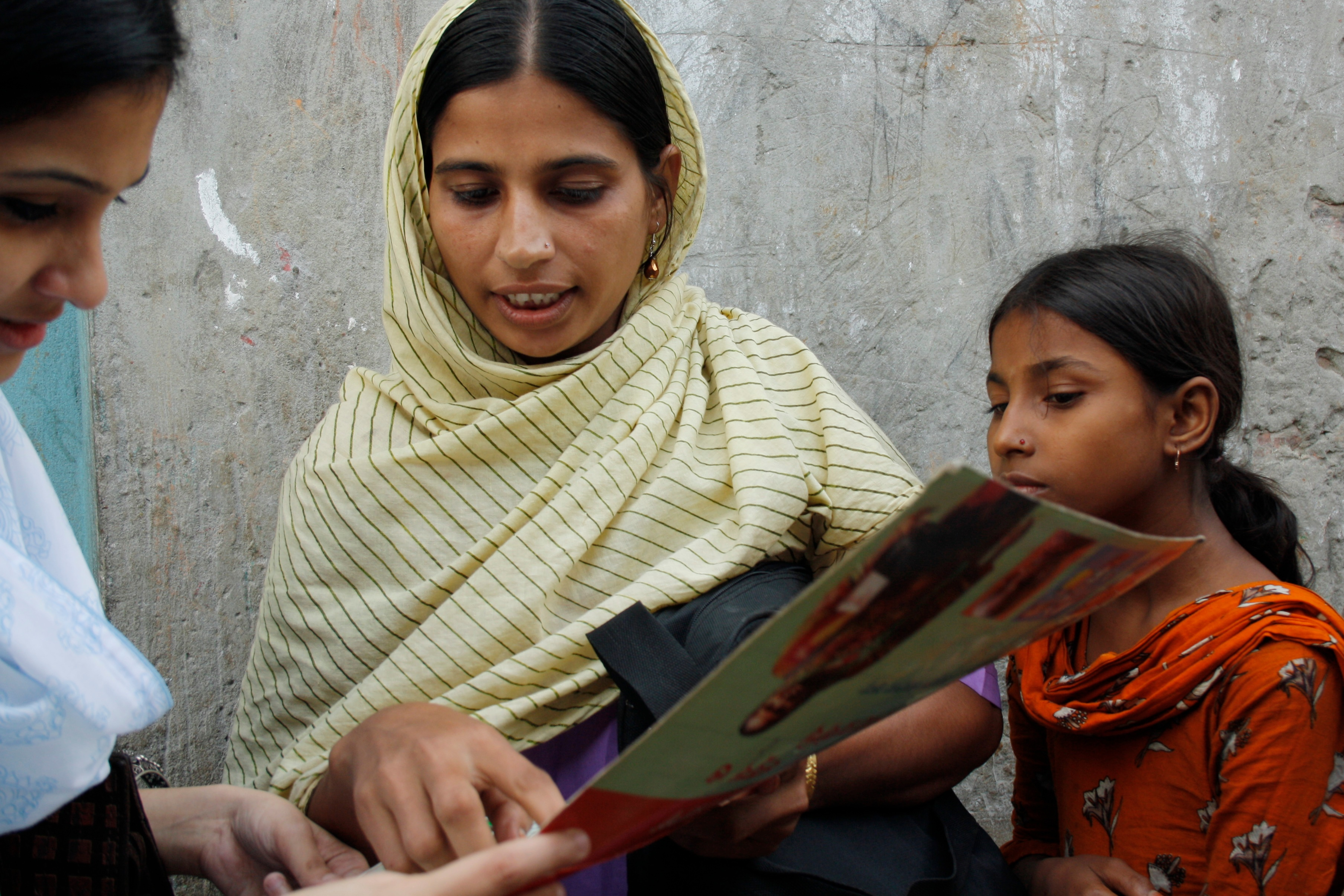
A community health worker conducting a survey in a slum of the capital city, Dhaka

Bangladesh, by the constitution, guarantees healthcare services as a fundamental right to all of its citizens. The Ministry of Health and Family Welfare is the largest institutional healthcare provider in Bangladesh, and contains two divisions: Health Service Division and Medical Education And Family Welfare Division. However, healthcare facilities in Bangladesh are considered less than adequate, although they have improved as the economy has grown and poverty levels have decreased significantly. Bangladesh faces a severe health workforce crisis, as formally trained providers make up a small percentage of the total health workforce. Significant deficiencies in the treatment practices of village doctors persist, with widespread harmful and inappropriate drug prescribing.

Bangladesh's poor healthcare system suffers from severe underfunding from the government. As of 2021, some 2.36% of total GDP was attributed to healthcare, and domestic general government spending on healthcare was 16.88% of the total budget, while out-of-pocket expenditures made up the vast majority of the total budget, totalling roughly 73%. Domestic private health expenditure was about 75.48% of the total healthcare expenditure. There were only 5.3 doctors per 10,000 people, and about six physicians and six nurses per 1,000 people, while the number of hospital beds is 9 per 1,000. The specialist surgical workforce was only 3 per 100,000 people, and there were about 5 community health workers per 1,000 people.

Roughly 60% of the population had access to drinking water in 2022. In 2002, it was estimated that half of the drinking water was polluted with arsenic, exceeding levels of 10 micrograms per litre. Bangladesh is crippled with one of the worst air qualities in the world, mostly concentrated in the densely populated urban areas, especially the capital Dhaka and its metropolitan area. The World Bank estimated that roughly 80,000–90,000 deaths occurred in Bangladesh due to the drastic effects of air pollution in 2019. It was second-leading cause of death and disability, costing the country roughly 4–4.4% of its total GDP.

As of 2022, the overall life expectancy in Bangladesh at birth was 74 years (72 years for males and 76 years for females). It has a comparably high infant mortality rate (24 per 1,000 live births) and child mortality rate (29 per 1,000 live births). As of 2020, maternal mortality remains high, clocking at 123 per 100,000 live births. Bangladesh is a key source market for medical tourism for various countries, mainly India, due to its citizens dissatisfaction and distrust over their own healthcare system.

The main causes of death are coronary artery disease, stroke, and chronic respiratory disease; comprising 62% and 60% of all adult male and female deaths, respectively. Malnutrition is a major and persistent problem in Bangladesh, mainly affecting the rural regions, more than half of the population suffers from it. Severe acute malnutrition affects 450,000 children, while nearly 2 million children have moderate acute malnutrition. For children under the age of five, 52% are affected by anaemia, 41% are stunted, 16% are wasted, and 36% are underweight. A quarter of women are underweight and around 15% have short stature, while over half also suffer from anaemia. Bangladesh was ranked 84th out of the 127 countries listed in the 2024 Global Hunger Index.

== Culture ==
=== Holidays and festivals ===
Traditional festivals include Pahela Baishakh (Bengali New Year), which is the major festival of Bengali culture, with widespread festivities. Pohela Falgun coincides with Valentine's Day, and is celebrated with a display of music, dance and other cultural activities. Other festivals include Nabonno and Poush Parbon, which celebrate new harvests of crops. Shakrain is an annual celebration, observed by flying kites, occurring at the end of Poush, the ninth month of the Bengali calendar. The festival coincides with Makar Sankranti celebrated in India and Nepal.

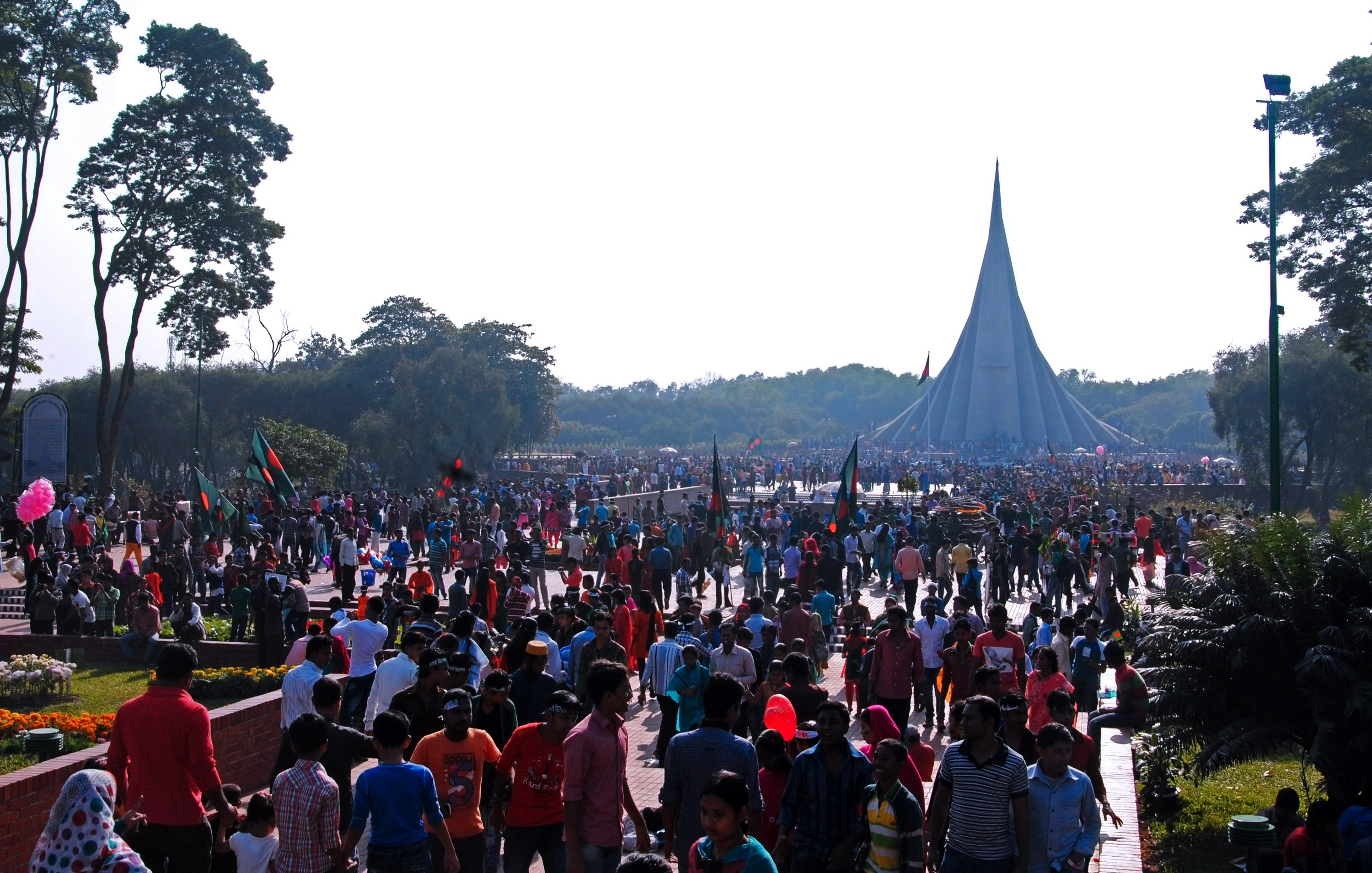
Victory Day celebration at National Martyrs' Memorial

Among religious festivals, the two biggest festivals of the Muslim majority are Eid al-Fitr, which marks the end of the month of Ramadan—and Eid al-Adha, which is the festival of sacrifice. Both Eids are associated with the longest periods of national holidays. Other Muslim festivals include Mawlid (Eid-e-Milad Un Nabi), Ashura on the tenth day of Muharram, Chaand Raat, and Shab-e-Barat, Shab-e-Meraj, Shab-e-Qadr during Ramadan and Bishwa Ijtema. The most celebrated Hindu festival is Durga Puja. Other major Hindu festivals include Krishna Janmashtami, Kali Puja, Saraswati Puja, and Ratha Yatra. The biggest festival of the Buddhists across the country is Buddha Purnima, which marks the birth of Gautama Buddha. Among Christians, Christmas, known as Boro Din, and Easter are the most widely celebrated.

Patriotic national festivals include the Language Movement Day, which is celebrated on 21 February in remembrance of the martyrs of the 1952 Bengali language movement. It was declared as International Mother Language Day by UNESCO in 1999. Independence Day is celebrated on 26 March to commemorate the proclamation of independence from Pakistan. Victory Day is celebrated on 16 December to celebrate the victory in the Bangladesh Liberation War. Public gatherings are observed at the Shaheed Minar and National Martyrs' Memorial during the three latter festivals to pay homage to the fallen martyrs.

=== Literature ===
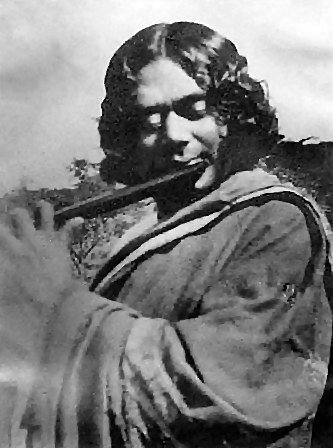
Kazi Nazrul Islam in Chittagong, c. 1926, the national poet of Bangladesh.

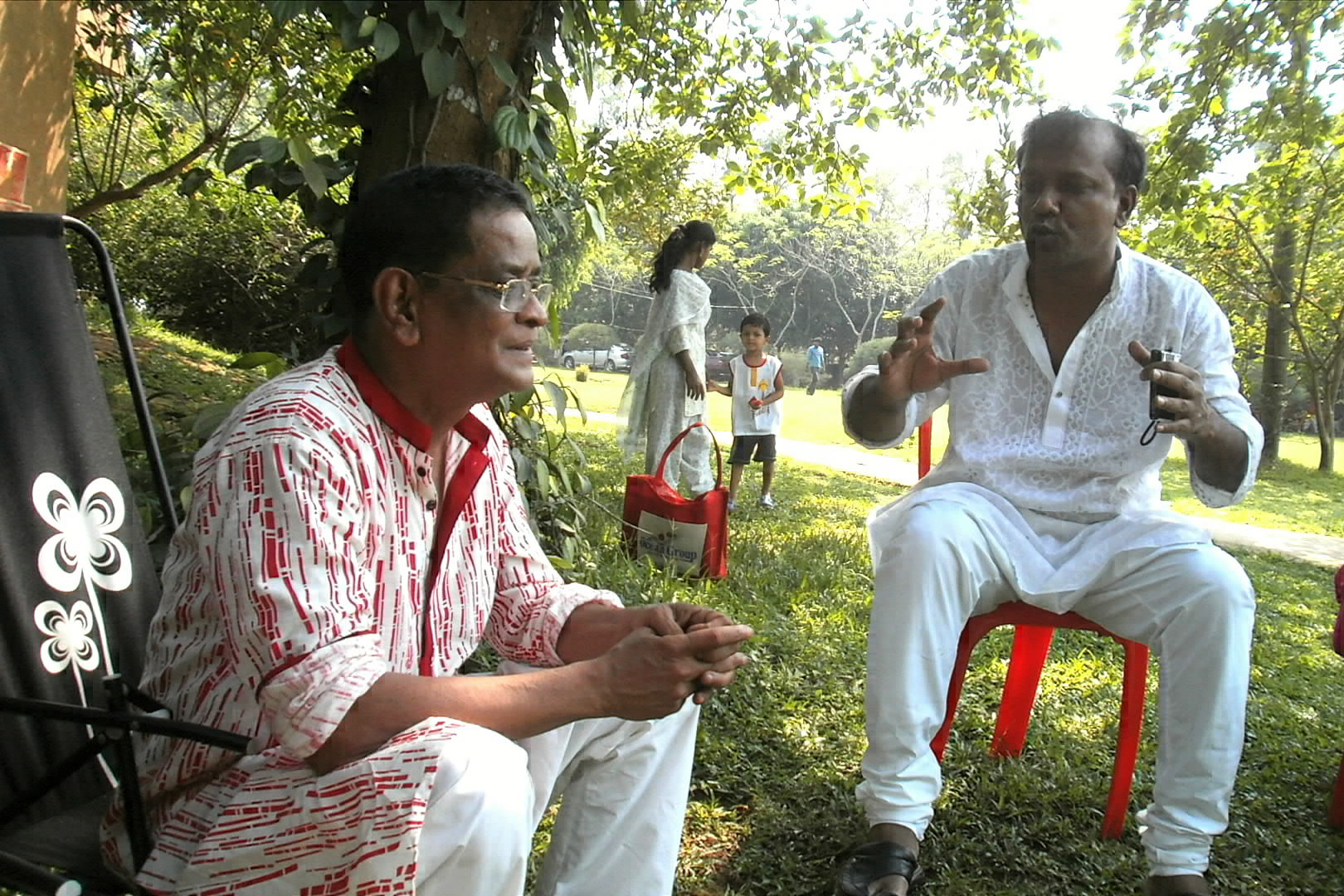
Humayun Ahmed (left), a popular author and filmmaker

Bengali literature forms an important part of Bengali culture. The Charyapada poems dating back to the 10th to 12th centuries are the oldest extant examples of the Bengali language. During the Bengal Sultanate, medieval Bengali writers were influenced by Arabic and Persian literature. Milestones of the medieval age include the Mangal-Kāvyas. The Vaishnava Padavali movement was led by writers such as Vidyapati, Chandidas, Govindadas and Balarama Dasa. Shreekrishna Kirtana written by Chandidas marked a particular height of poetic achievement since the Charyapadas. Other important works include Krittibas Ojha's translation of the Ramayana, Kashiram Das' translation of the Mahabharata, and Maladhar Basu's translation of the Bhagavata. Writers such as Bipradas Pipilai, Vijay Gupta, Shah Muhammad Sagir, Zainuddin and Abdul Hakim were important figures. Alaol, considered a bard, is a prolific poet of medieval period.

The Bengal Renaissance from the late 18th century to the early 20th century had a profound effect on modern Bengali literature. Michael Madhusudan Dutt invented the blank verse in Bengali literature. Mir Mosharraf Hossain was the first prominent Bengali Muslim writer. Lalon, a fakir practising Sufism and sādhanā influenced the bauls. Sarat Chandra Chattopadhyay wrote about the characteristics of the Bengali society.

Rabindranath Tagore was the first Asian and non-European laureate of the Nobel Prize in Literature. Kazi Nazrul Islam was a revolutionary poet who espoused political rebellion against colonialism and fascism. Jibanananda Das was the most recognised Bengali poet after Tagore and Nazrul. Begum Rokeya is regarded as the pioneer feminist writer of Bangladesh. Syed Mujtaba Ali is noted for his cosmopolitan views. Jasimuddin was a renowned pastoral poet, popularly called Palli Kabi (folk poet). Farrukh Ahmad is considered the poet of the "Islamic Renaissance". Syed Waliullah was a notable novelist.

Shamsur Rahman and Al Mahmud are considered two of the greatest Bangladeshi poets to have emerged in the late 20th century. Ahmed Sofa is regarded as the most important intellectual in the post-independence era. Sufia Kamal was a major feminist writer. Humayun Ahmed was the most popular author in post-Independence Bangladesh. Shahidul Zahir was widely acclaimed for his usage of magical realism. Other major writers include Akhteruzzaman Elias, Shawkat Osman and Syed Shamsul Haq. Selina Hossain is a prolific female author in the modern era. Muhammad Zafar Iqbal is a pioneer science fiction writer. Anisul Hoque is a popular contemporary literary figure. The annual Ekushey Book Fair and Dhaka Lit Fest, organised by the Bangla Academy, are among the largest literary festivals in South Asia.

=== Architecture ===
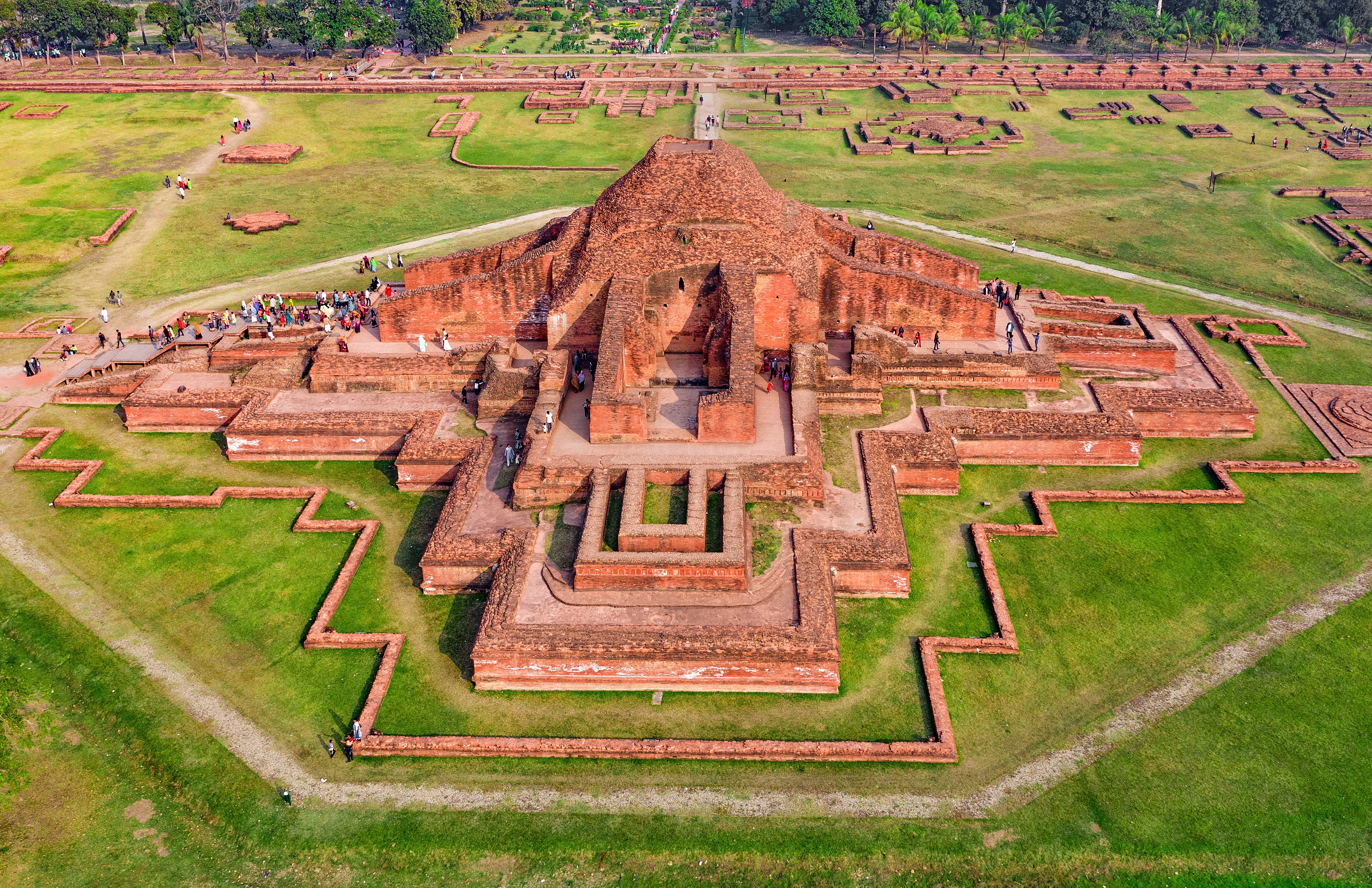
Somapura Mahavihara in Naogaon, a UNESCO World Heritage Site

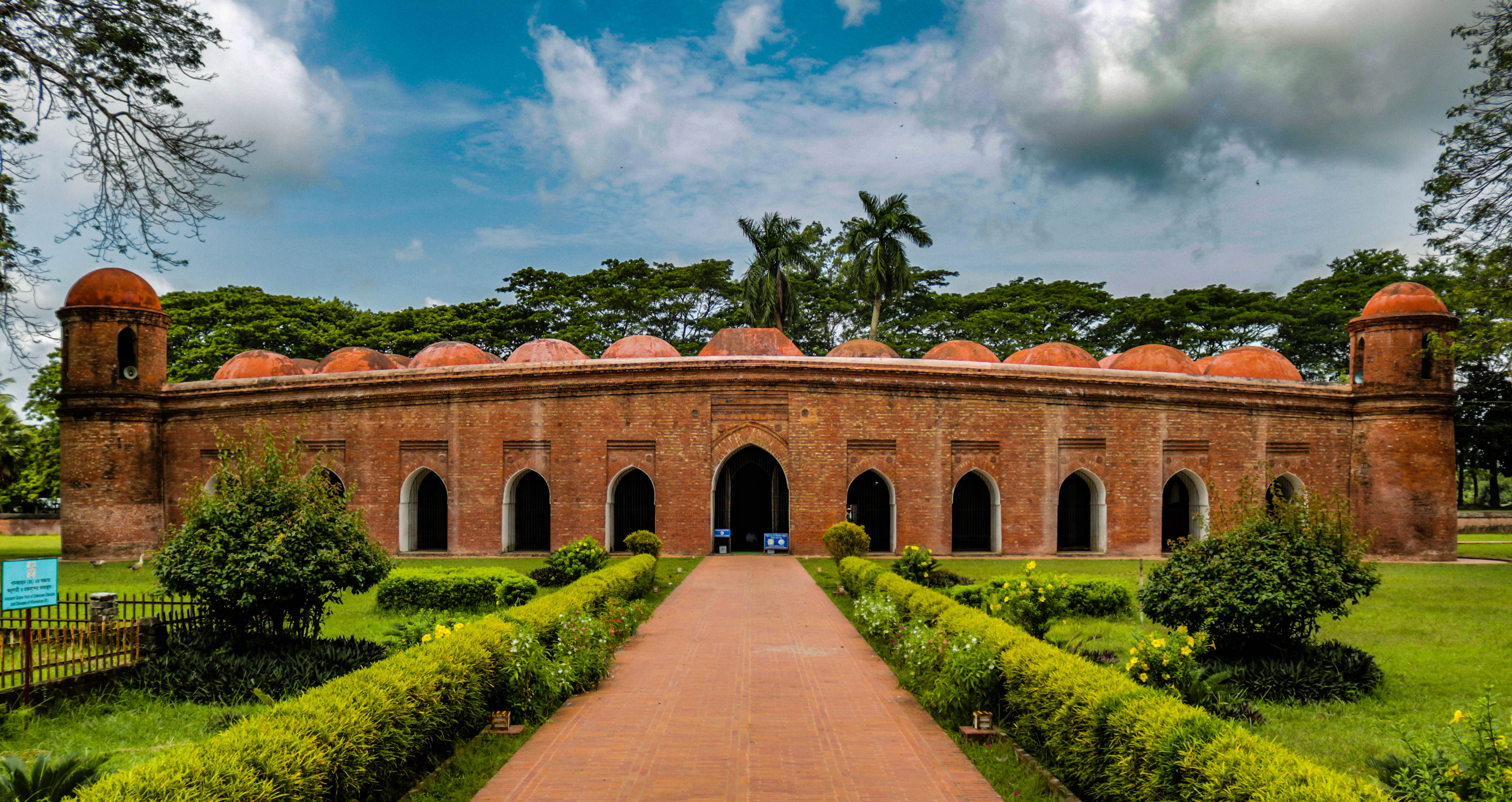
The Sixty Dome Mosque in Bagerhat, a UNESCO World Heritage Site

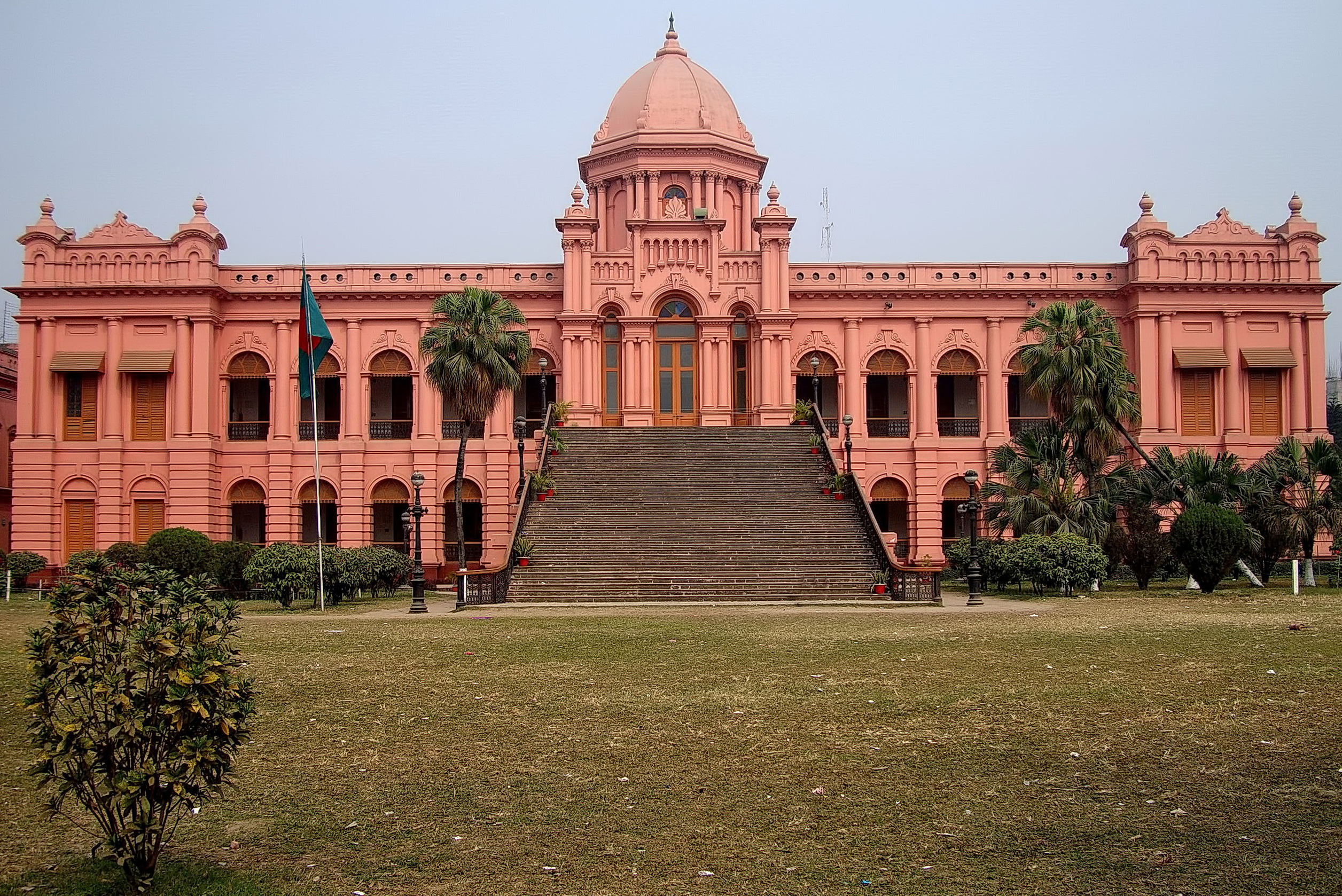
The Ahsan Manzil in Old Dhaka

The architecture of Bangladesh is intertwined with that of the Bengal region and the broader Indian subcontinent. It is influenced by the country's culture, religion and history. Hindu and Buddhist architectural remnants have been found in Mahasthangarh, which dates back to the 3rd century BCE. Nandipada and Swastika symbols have been found on stone querns in the Wari-Bateshwar ruins, which indicate the presence of Hinduism in the area during the Iron Age—from 400 to 100 BCE. The Somapura Mahavihara built under the rule of the Buddhist Pala Empire in the 8th century is a notable example of the pre-Islamic era. Other Buddhist vihāras include Shalban Bihar in Mainamati and Bikrampur Vihara in Bikrampur. Recent excavations have also uncovered new evidence of pre-Islamic smaller temples which served the Hindu, Buddhist and Jain populations of the area. Indo-Islamic architecture can be seen from the 13th century, especially in the distinctive mosque architecture of the Bengal Sultanate, an example being the Sixty Dome Mosque among others in the Mosque City of Bagerhat—which is a UNESCO World Heritage Site.

Mughal Bengal saw the spread of Mughal architecture in the region. Examples in Dhaka include the Bara Katra and Choto Katra in Old Dhaka, the Sat Gambuj Mosque in Mohammadpur and the Musa Khan Mosque in Curzon Hall. Notable Mughal-era forts include the Lalbagh Fort in Old Dhaka, the Idrakpur Fort in Munshiganj—and the Hajiganj Fort and the Sonakanda Fort in Narayanganj, respectively. The Kantajew Temple and Dhakeshwari Temple are examples of late medieval Hindu temple architecture. Bengali vernacular architecture is noted for pioneering the bungalow. Panam Nagar in Sonargaon exhibits architectural influence from the Sultanate, Mughal, British and hybrid colonial traditions. Indo-Saracenic architecture flourished during the British Raj, examples include the Curzon Hall of the University of Dhaka, the Chittagong Court Building, Rangpur Town Hall and Rajshahi College. The zamindar gentry built many palaces in the latter style, including the Ahsan Manzil, the Baliati Zamnidar Bari, the Tajhat Palace, the Rose Garden Palace, the Dighapatia Palace, the Puthia Rajbari, Natore Rajbari and the Mohera Zamindar Bari. Muzharul Islam is considered to be a pioneer of modernist movement in Bangladesh and South Asia. Louis Kahn is a notable foreign architect who designed the National Parliament Building in Sher-e-Bangla Nagar.

=== Visual arts, crafts and clothing ===
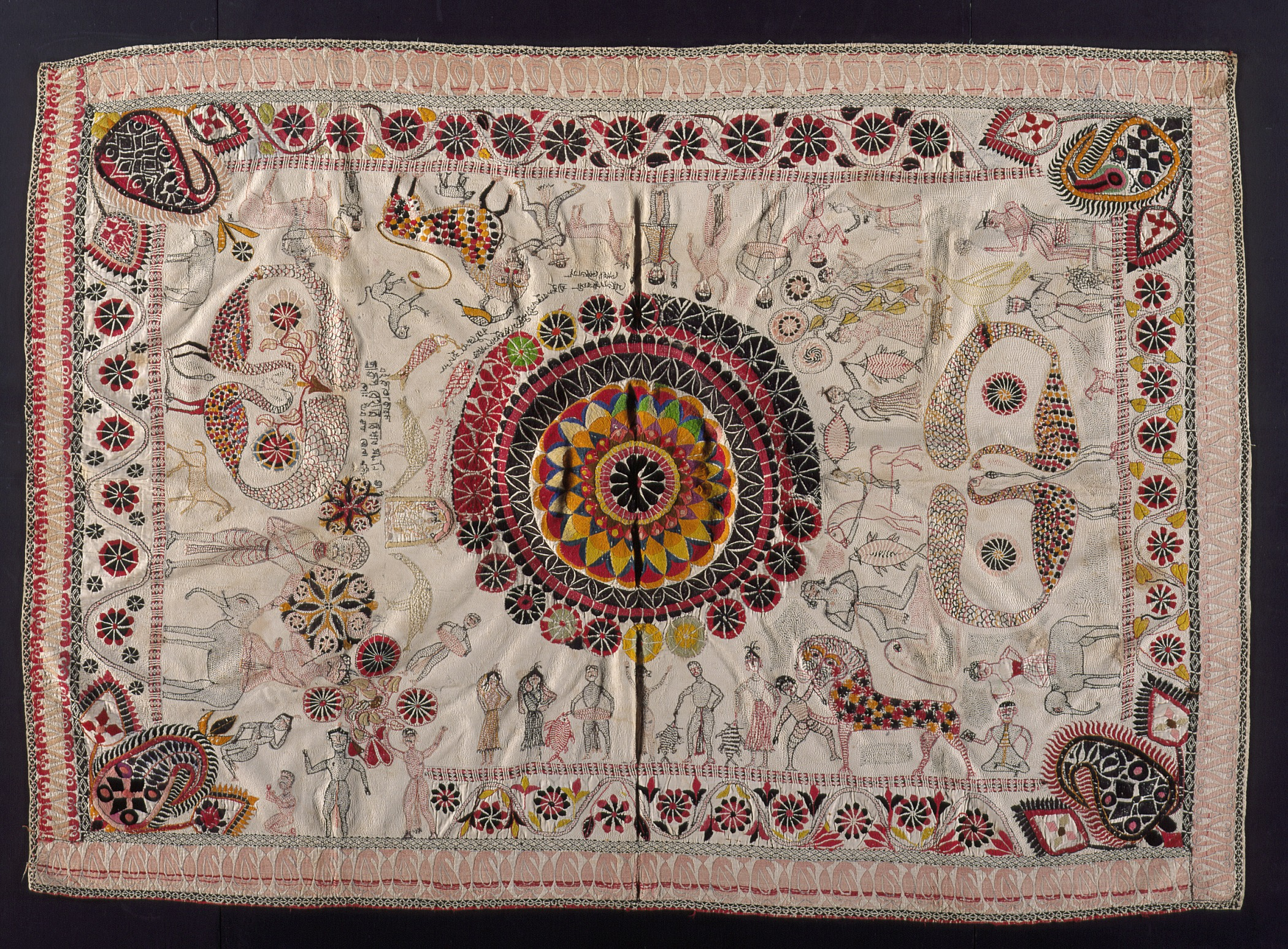
Embroidery on Nakshi kantha (embroidered quilt), a centuries-old Bengali art tradition

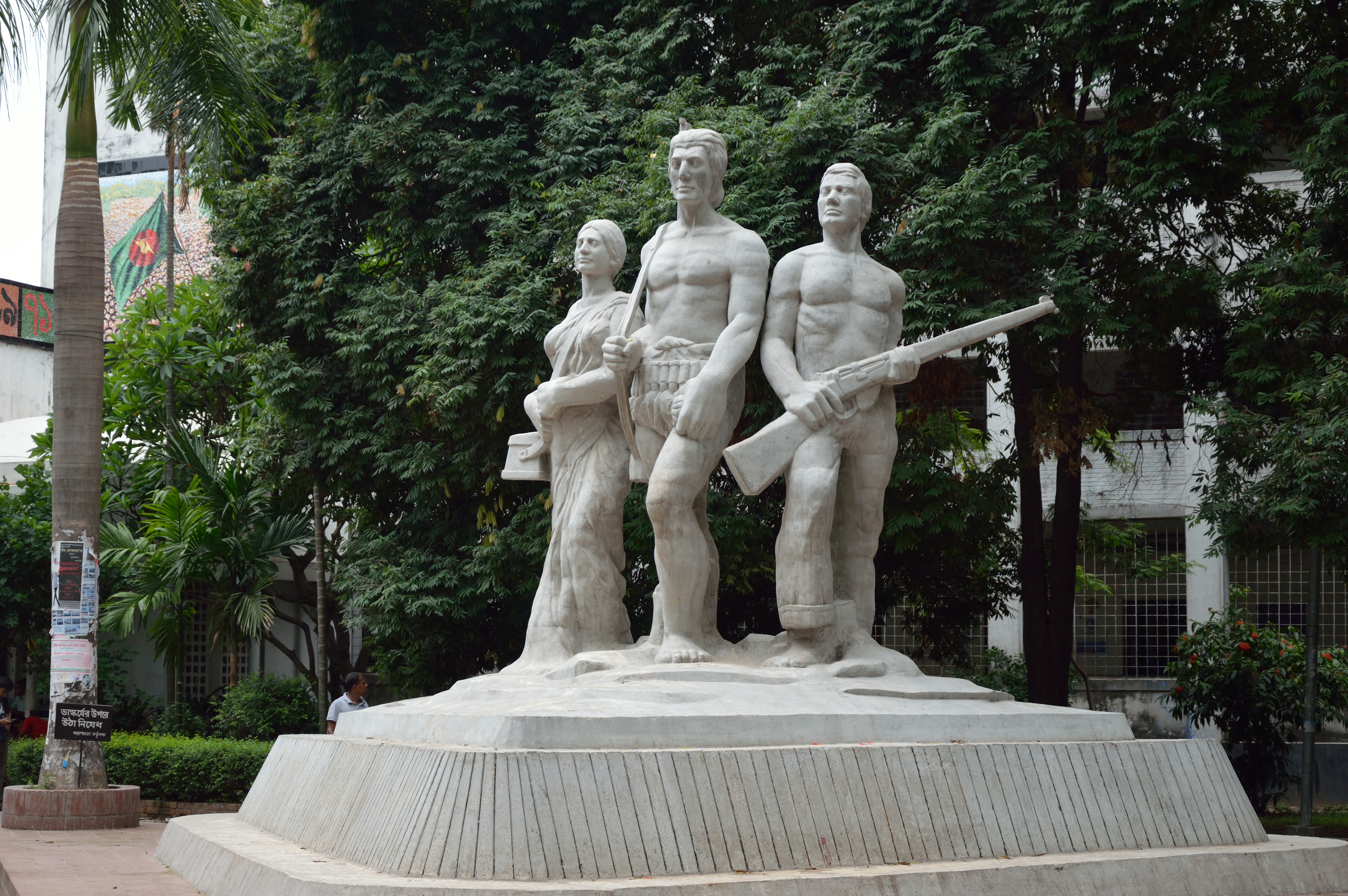
Aparajeyo Bangla, a sculpture dedicated to the Bangladesh Liberation War, located on the campus of the University of Dhaka

The recorded history of art in Bangladesh can be traced to the 3rd century BCE, when terracotta sculptures were made in the region. In classical antiquity, notable sculptural Hindu, Jain, and Buddhist art developed in the Pala Empire and the Sena dynasty. The Bengal Sultanate saw Islamic art evolve since the 14th century. During the Mughal rule, Jamdani, a fine-muslin textile, was woven with Persian motifs in Dhaka. It was classified by UNESCO as an Intangible cultural heritage in 2013. Bangladesh also produces the Rajshahi silk, a fine silk noted for its softness and use in patterned textiles. Ivory, brass and pottery have deep roots in Bangladeshi culture. The Nakshi Kantha, a centuries-old embroidery tradition for quilts in Bengal, is made throughout Bangladesh. The modern art movement in Bangladesh took shape in post-independence East Bengal, especially with the pioneering works of Zainul Abedin. Other leading painters include SM Sultan, Mohammad Kibria, Safiuddin Ahmed, Shahabuddin Ahmed, Kanak Chanpa Chakma, Qayyum Chowdhury, Rashid Choudhury, Quamrul Hassan, Rafiqun Nabi and Syed Jahangir.

Novera Ahmed is the pioneer of modernist sculpture in Bangladesh. Other eminent sculptors include Nitun Kundu, Syed Abdullah Khalid, Hamiduzzaman Khan, Shamim Sikder, Ferdousi Priyabhashini and Abdur Razzaque. The annual Mangal Shobhajatra (Bengali New Year parade) organised by the Faculty of Fine Arts of the University of Dhaka on Pohela Boishakh was enlisted as an Intangible cultural heritage by UNESCO in 2016. Photography as a form of art has seen rapid growth in the 21st century. Chobi Mela, held biennially, is considered the largest photography festival in Asia.

Lungi is the most common informal clothing for men, while kurta (panjabi) and pajama are worn by men on festivals and holidays. Domestically tailored suits, neckties and pants are customarily worn by men at formal events, and the traditional sherwani and churidar are worn along with the turban in weddings. Women commonly wear the shalwar kameez accompanied by orna; while sari is worn on more formal events. Some women follow Islamic clothing.

=== Performing arts ===
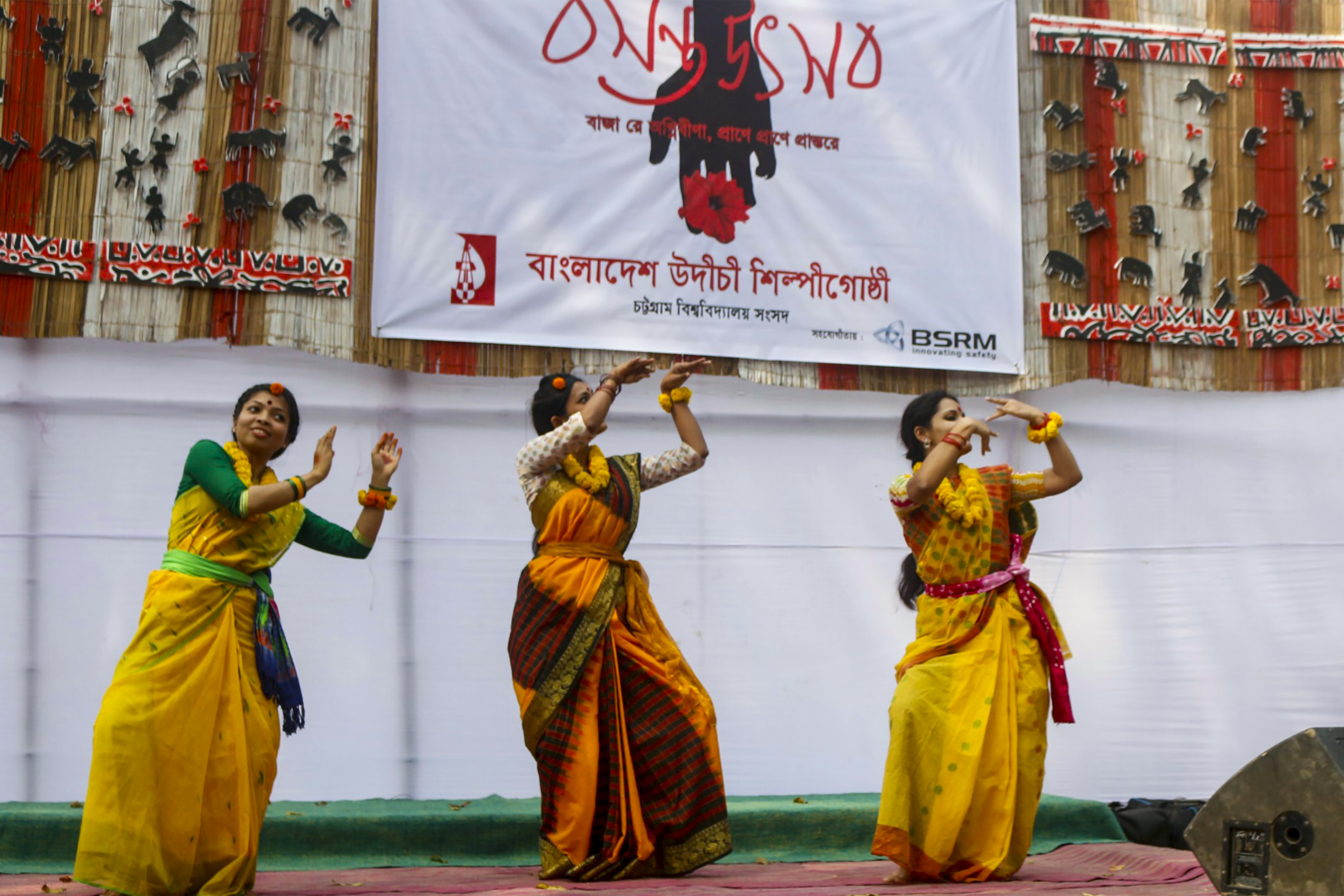
Dance in celebration of Pohela Falgun at the University of Chittagong

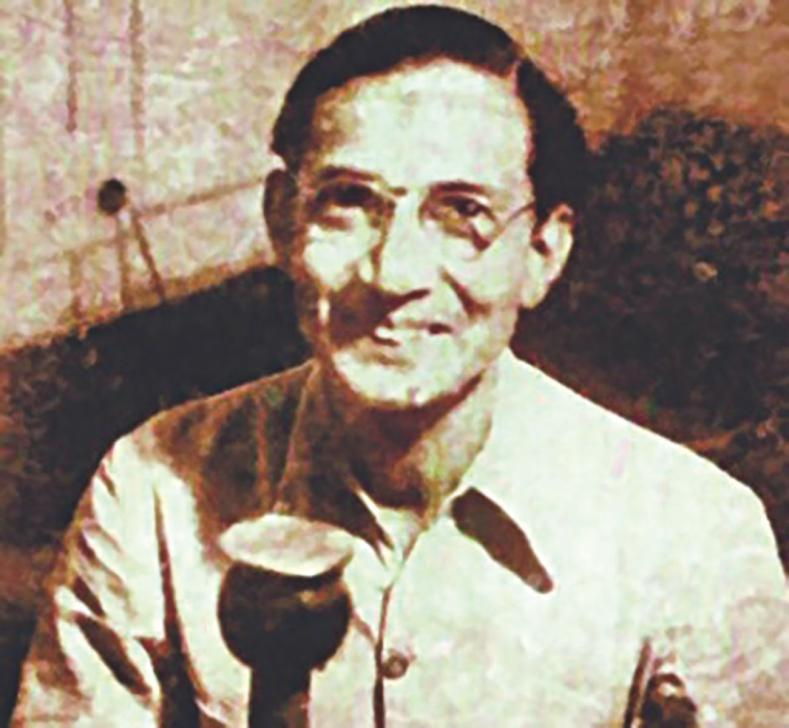
Legendary folklore singer Abbasuddin Ahmed

Theatre in Bangladesh includes various forms with a history dating back to the 4th century CE. It includes narrative forms, song and dance forms, supra-personae forms, performances with scroll paintings, puppet theatre and processional forms. The Jatra is the most popular form of Bengali folk theatre. Apart from the various forms of Indian classical dances, including the Kathakali, Bharatanatyam, Odissi and Manipuri dances—native dance traditions that developed across the country.

Music of Bangladesh can be classed into classical, light-classical, devotional, and popular. Classical music in Bangladesh is represented by the common forms of devotional music across the Indian subcontinent, such as the Hindustani classical music genre dhrupad and khayal. Other major forms include qawwali and kirtan. Rabindra Sangeet and Nazrul Sangeet retain their popularity. Native folk music features the baul mystical tradition, which was popularised by Lalon in the 18th century, and is listed by UNESCO as a Masterpiece of Intangible Cultural Heritage. Other native lyric-based forms of folk music include bhatiali, bhawaiya, dhamail, kavigan, jarigan, sari gan, marfati, and gombhira. Abbasuddin Ahmed and Abdul Alim are two famous folk singers of the twentieth century.

Folk music is accompanied by instruments such as the ektara, dotara, dhol, bansuri (a type of flute), mandira, khanjani, sarinda, khamak, dugdugi, juri, jhunjhuni and majira (a type of cymbal). Bangladesh has a rich tradition of Indian classical music, which uses instruments like the sitar, tabla, sarod, and santoor. Musical organisations and schools such as the Bangladesh Shilpakala Academy and Chhayanaut have helped preserve the traditions of Bengali folk music.

Sabina Yasmin and Runa Laila are considered two of the greatest female playback singers in the country. Andrew Kishore, another leading playback singer, is considered the "King of Playback". Azam Khan, nicknamed the "Pop Samrat" and the "Rock Guru", is a founding figure of Bangladeshi rock. Musicians such as Ayub Bachchu and James have also gained nationwide popularity. Shayan Chowdhury Arnob has been an influential figure in indie rock. Popular pop singers in the 21st century include Habib Wahid and Tahsan Rahman Khan. Influential heavy metal include Artcell and Warfaze.

=== Media and cinema ===
The history of press in Bangladesh dates back to 1860, when the first printing press was established in Dhaka. Bangladesh has a diverse media landscape, including commercial and state-owned outlets. Prominent news agencies in Bangladesh include Bangladesh Sangbad Sangstha (BSS) and Bdnews24.com. Television is the most popular form of media consumption. Bangladesh Television (BTV) is the sole state-owned television network with nationwide coverage. Private television networks include ATN Bangla, Channel I, NTV, RTV, Ekushey TV, Ekattor TV, Jamuna TV and Somoy TV. Print media is the second-most widely consumed, and newspapers are privately owned and outspoken, including The Daily Star, Dhaka Tribune, The Financial Express, Bangladesh Pratidin, Kaler Kantho, Prothom Alo, The Daily Ittefaq and Jugantor.

Administrative building of Bangladesh Television in Rampura, Dhaka

Bangladesh Betar is the lone state-run radio service. Radio Foorti, Radio Today, Radio Aamar and ABC Radio were popular privately owned radio stations; popularity of radio has declined significantly. Popular foreign media include BBC News (BBC Bangla), CNN, VOA and Al Jazeera. Indian television drama has a substantial presence on Bangladeshi satellite television. Freedom of the press remains a major concern due to government attempts at censorship and the harassment of journalists. Bangladesh ranked 152nd out of the 180 countries listed in the 2026 World Press Freedom Index, among the lowest rankings in the world. The cinema of Bangladesh dates back to a screening of a bioscope in 1898. The Nawabs of Dhaka patronised the production of several silent films from the 1900s. Picture House, the first permanent cinema in Dhaka, began its operation during the year between 1913 and 1914. Sukumari (The Good Girl), released in 1929, was the first film produced in Bangladesh. The Last Kiss, the first full-length feature film, was released in 1931. By 1947, a total of 80 cinemas were listed. The first Bengali-language film in East Pakistan, Mukh O Mukhosh (Face and Mask), was released in 1956. Akash ar Mati (Sky and Earth), released in 1959, was the second film as such.

The Bangladesh Film Development Corporation was founded in Dhaka as the East Pakistan Film Development Corporation in 1957–1958, as a full-service film production studio. Zahir Raihan made various influential films throughout the period, notably Kokhono Asheni in 1961, Shangam in 1964 (the first colour film in Pakistan), and Jibon Theke Neowa in 1970. The film industry in Dhaka positioned itself as the base for a Bengali Muslim cinema from the 1960s onward. The first movie post-Independence, Ora Egaro Jon, was directed by Chashi Nazrul Islam and released in 1972. At the industry's peak, about 80 movies were produced each year between 1996 and 2003, a number which has constantly declined thereafter. Prominent directors include Khan Ataur Rahman, Alamgir Kabir, Amjad Hossain, Humayun Ahmed, Morshedul Islam, Tanvir Mokammel, Tareque Masud, Salahuddin Lavlu and Enamul Karim Nirjhar. Tareque Masud was honoured by FIPRESCI at the 2002 Cannes Film Festival for his film Matir Moina (The Clay Bird). Film societies have contributed to the development of cinema in Bangladesh.

=== Cuisine ===
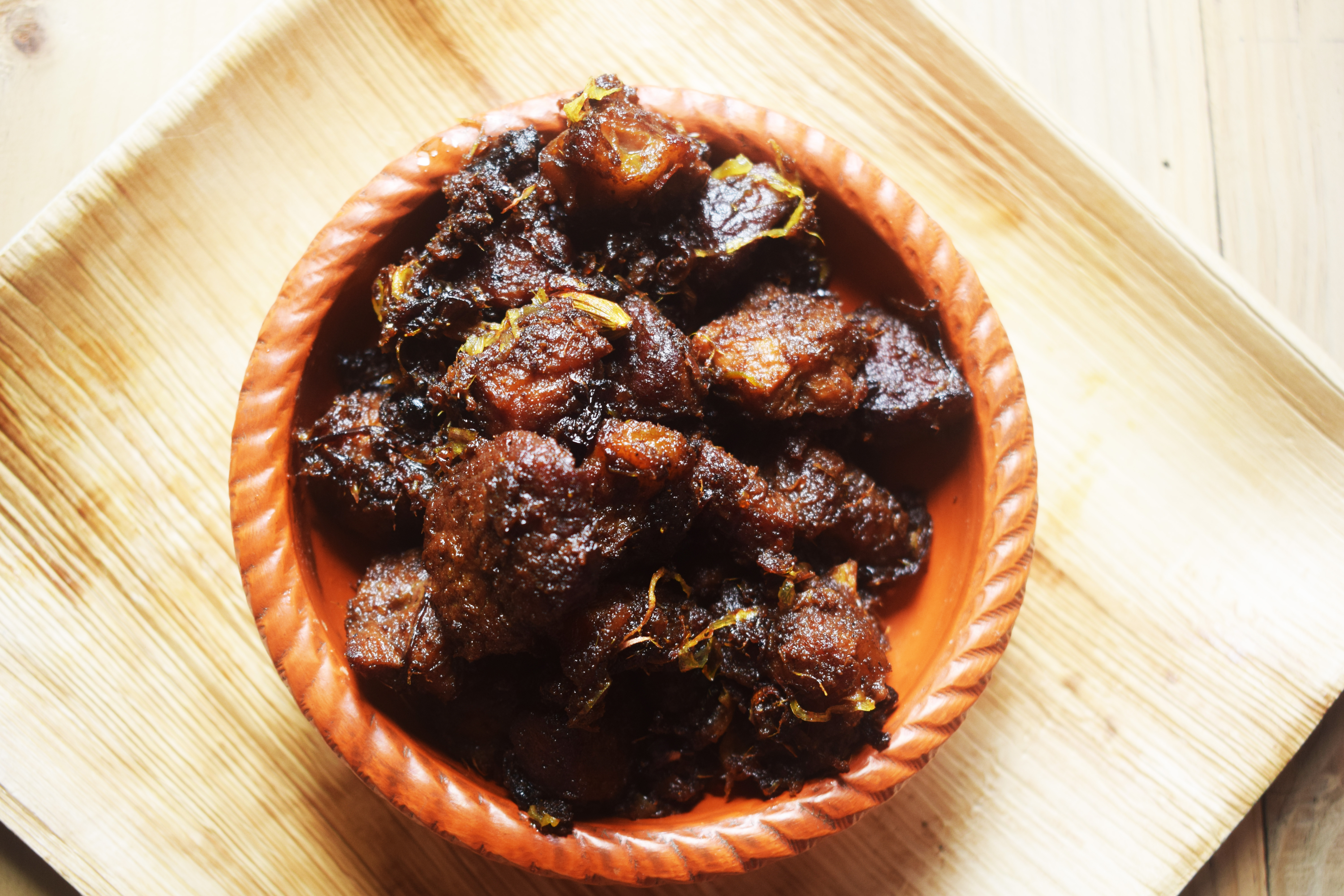
Kala bhuna, a beef dish from Chittagong Division

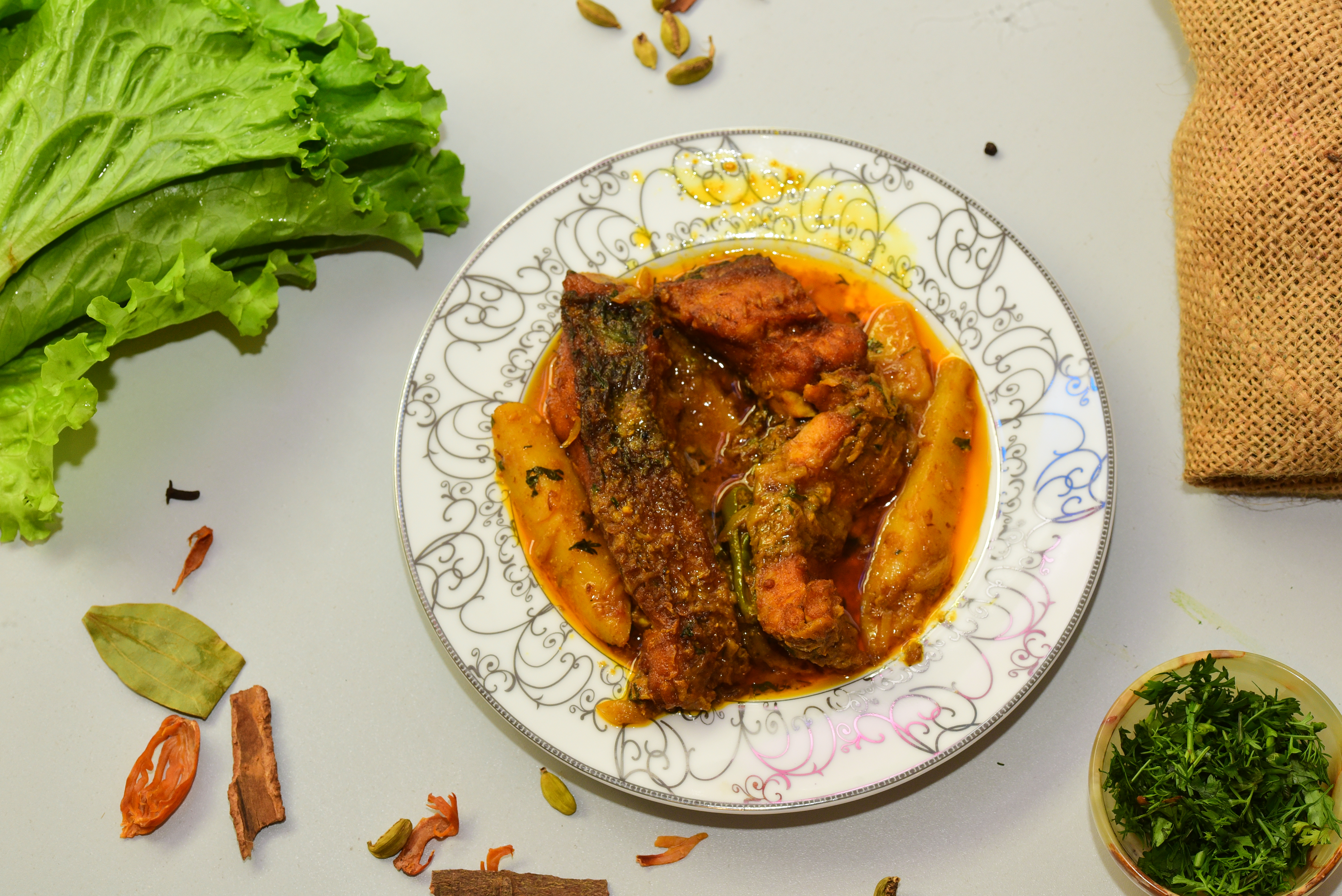
Rohu curry, a fish-based dish

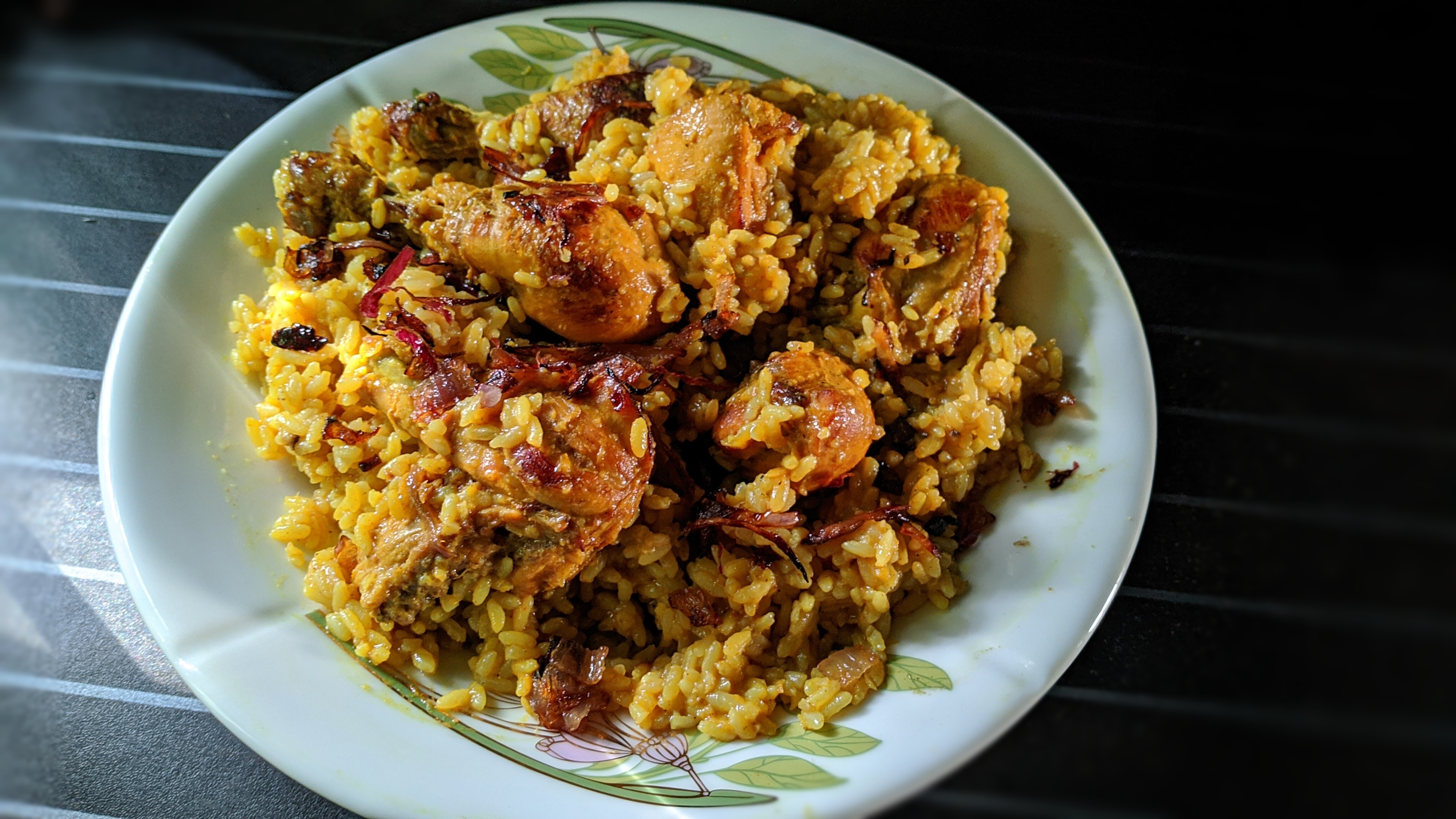
Chicken pilaf (Morog Polao), a traditional dish from Old Dhaka

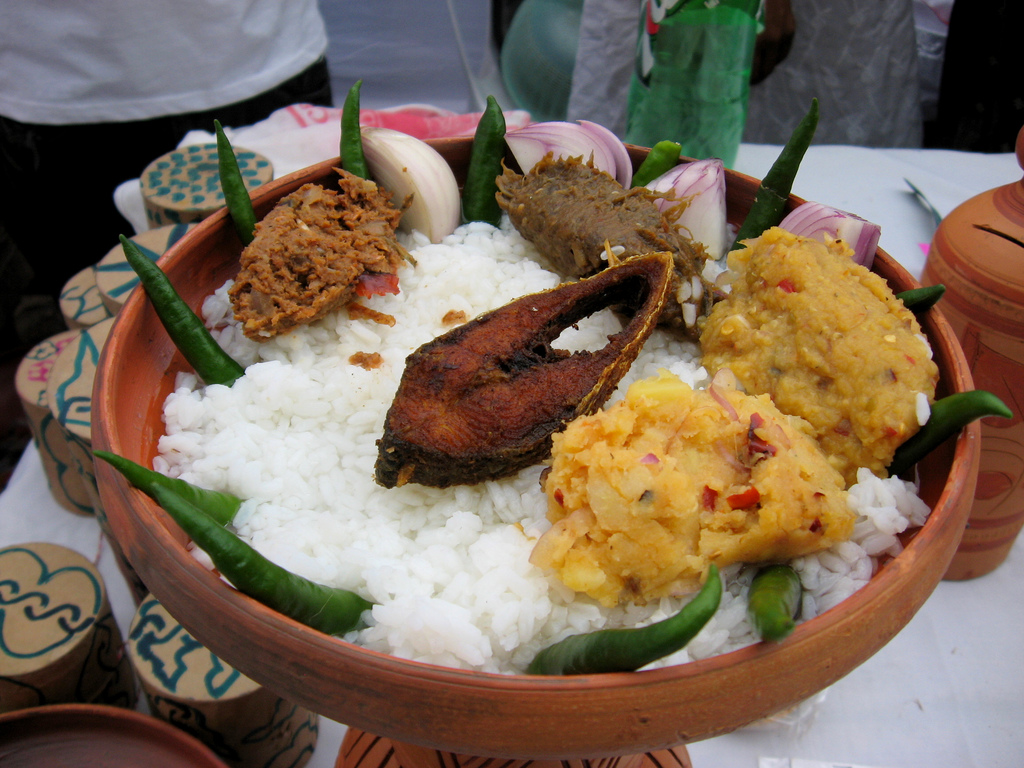
Traditional Pohela Boishakh meal Panta-ilish (Fermented rice and fried Hilsa fish with other savory items like Vorta and Achar)

Bangladeshi cuisine has been shaped by the nation's geographic location, climate, and history. The staple dish is white rice, which along with fish, forms the culinary base. Varieties of leaf vegetables, potatoes, gourds and lentils (dal) also play an important role. Curries of beef, mutton, chicken and duck are commonly consumed, along with multiple types of bhortas (mashed vegetables), bhajis (stir fried vegetables) and tarkaris (curried vegetables). Mughal-influenced dishes include kormas, kalias, biryanis, pulaos, teharis and khichuris. Among the various used spices, turmeric, fenugreek, nigella, coriander, anise, cardamom and chili powder are widely used; a famous spice mix is the panch phoron. Condiments and herbs used include red onions, green chillies, garlic, ginger, cilantro, and mint. Coconut milk, mustard paste, mustard seeds, mustard oil, ghee, achars and chutneys are also widely used in the cuisine.

Fish is the main source of protein, owing to the country's riverine geography, and it is often eaten with its roe. The hilsa is the national fish and is widely consumed. Other highly consumed fish include rohu, pangas, and tilapia. Lobsters, shrimps and dried fish (shutki) also play an important role in local cuisine. In Chittagong, dishes involving beef include kala bhuna and mezban, the latter being a traditionally popular feast, featuring the serving of mezbani gosht, a hot and spicy beef curry. In Sylhet, the shatkora lemons are used to marinate dishes, a notable example is beef hatkora. Among the tribal communities in the Chittagong Hill Tracts, cooking with bamboo shoots is popular. Khulna is known for using chui jhal (piper chaba) in its meat-based dishes. Kalai ruti, a type of rustic flatbread, is widely consumed in Chapai Nawabganj of Rajshahi.

Bangladesh has a wide range of desserts, including sweets such as the roshogolla, roshmalai, chomchom, sondesh, mishti doi and kalojaam, and jilapi. Pithas are traditional boiled desserts made with rice or fruits. Halwa, shemai and falooda, the latter two variations of vermicelli, are popular desserts during religious festivities. Ruti, naan, paratha, luchi and bakarkhani are the main local breads. Hot milk tea is the most commonly consumed beverage in the country, being at the centre of group conversations. Borhani, mattha and lassi are popular traditionally consumed beverages. Kebabs are widely popular, particularly seekh kebab, chapli kebab, shami kebab, chicken tikka and shashlik, along with various types of chaaps. Popular street foods include chotpoti, jhal muri, shingara, samosa and fuchka.

=== Sports ===
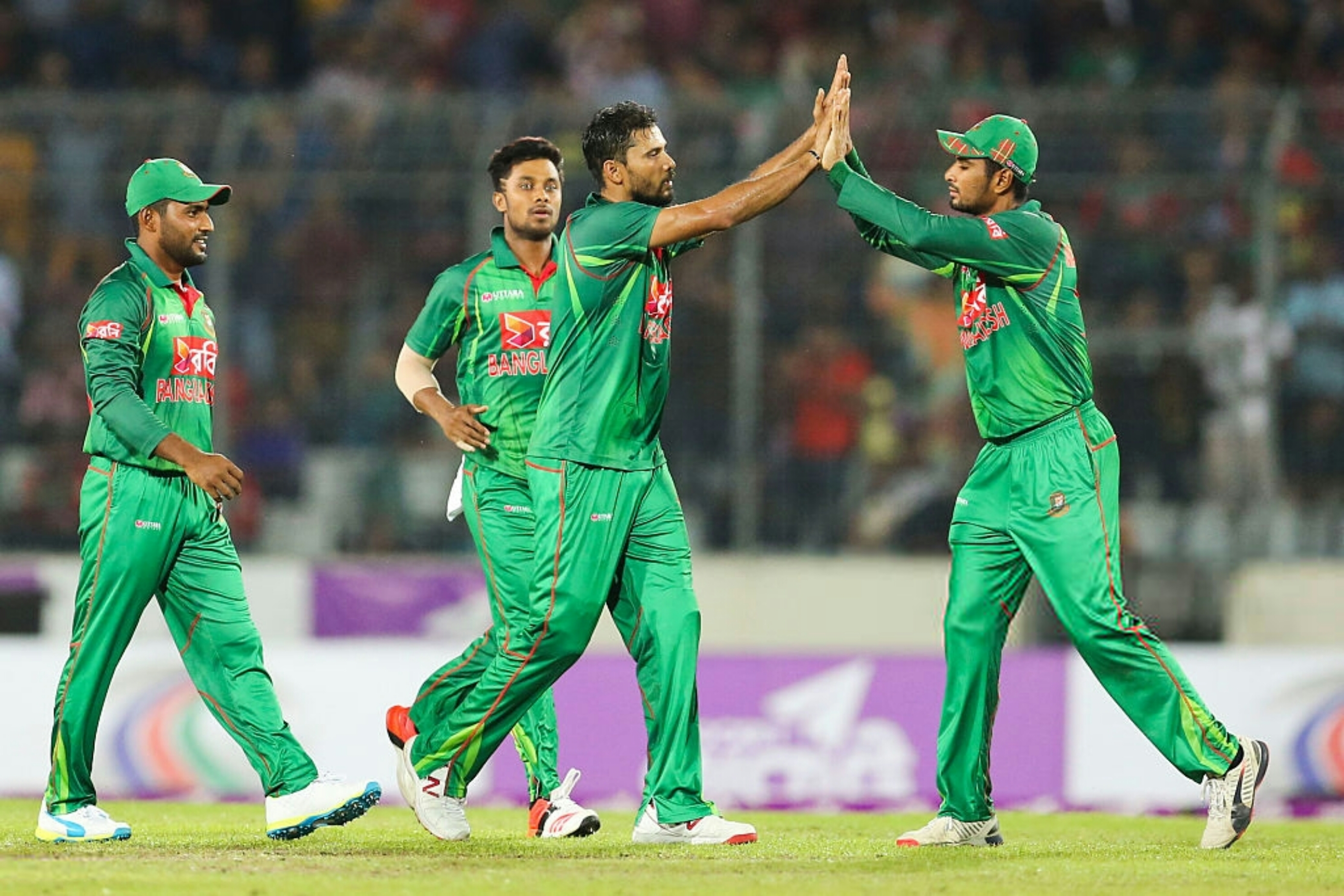
Bangladesh cricket team

In rural Bangladesh, several traditional indigenous sports such as Kabaddi, Boli Khela, Lathi Khela and Nouka Baich remain fairly popular. While Kabaddi is recognized as the national sport, Cricket is widely described as the most popular sport in the country. The national cricket team played their first Cricket World Cup in 1999 and were granted Test cricket status the following year. Bangladesh reached the quarter-final of the 2015 Cricket World Cup, the semi-final of the 2017 ICC Champions Trophy and reached the final of the Asia Cup 3 times – in 2012, 2016, and 2018. Shakib Al Hasan is widely regarded as one of the greatest all-rounders in the history of the sport. In 2020, the Bangladesh national under-19 cricket team won the men's Under-19 Cricket World Cup. The Bangladesh national under-19 cricket team also won the U-19 Asia cup in 2023 and 2024 consecutively. In 2018, the Bangladesh women's national cricket team won the 2018 Women's Twenty20 Asia Cup.

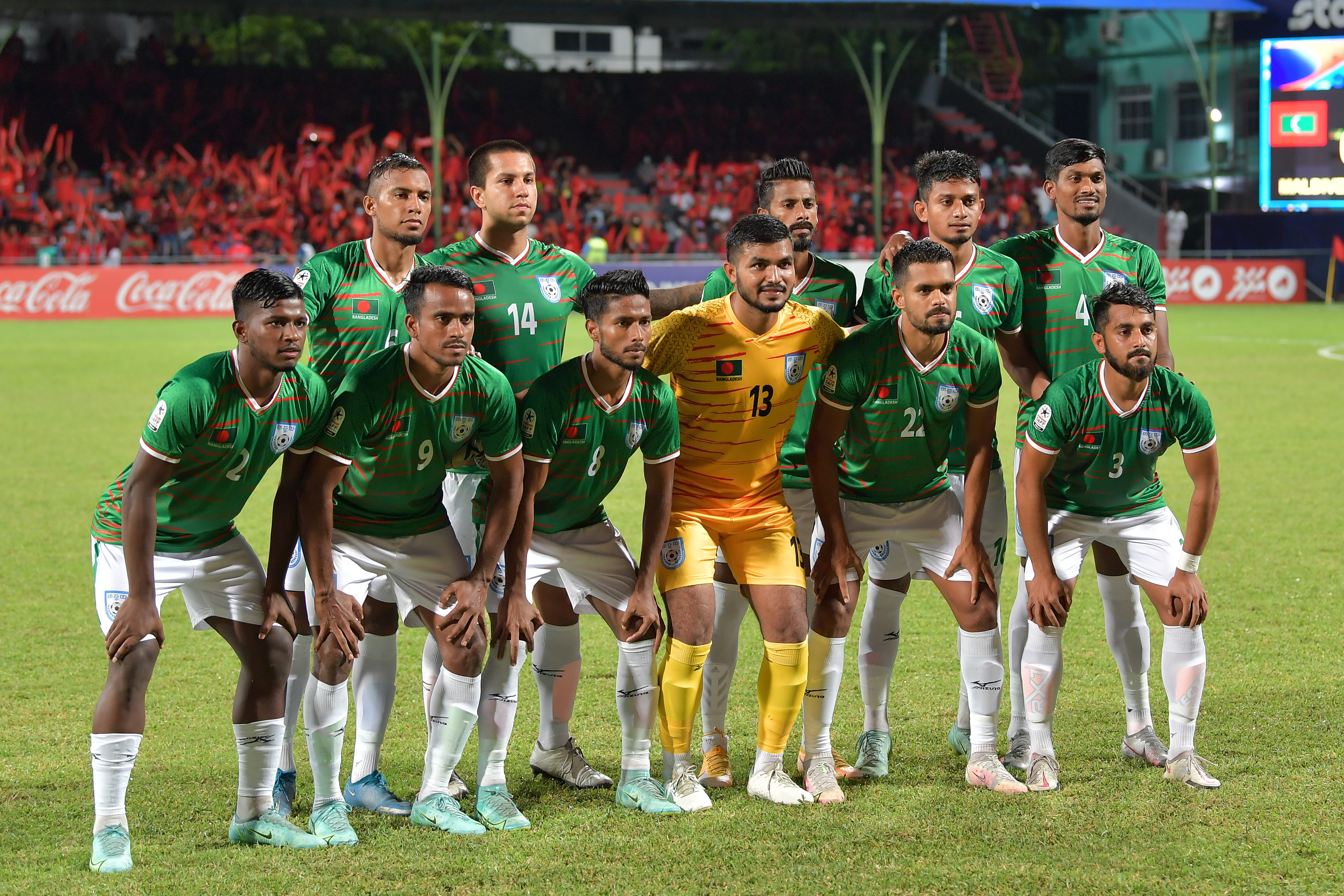
Bangladesh football team

Football is the second-most popular sport in Bangladesh, following cricket. The first instance of a national football team was the emergence of the Shadhin Bangla football team during the liberation war of 1971. On 25 July 1971, the team's captain, Zakaria Pintoo, became the first person to hoist the Bangladesh flag on foreign land before their match in neighbouring India. Following independence, the national football team made its debut in 1973 and eventually qualified for the AFC Asian Cup (1980), becoming only the second South Asian team to do so. Notable achievements in Bangladeshi football include the 2003 SAFF Gold Cup and 1999 South Asian Games. The Bangladesh women's national football team won the SAFF Women's Championship consecutively in 2022 and 2024. Bangladesh archers Ety Khatun and Roman Sana won all 10 gold medals in the archery events (individual and team) in the 2019 South Asian Games. The National Sports Council regulates 42 sporting federations. Chess is very popular in Bangladesh. Bangladesh has five grandmasters in chess. Among them, Niaz Murshed was the first grandmaster in South Asia. In 2010, mountain climber Musa Ibrahim became the first Bangladeshi climber to conquer Mount Everest. Wasfia Nazreen is the first Bangladeshi climber to climb the Seven Summits and the K2. Babar Ali became the first Bangladeshi to climb Mount Makalu in May 2026.

== See also ==
- Outline of Bangladesh
