= Halud Vihara =

Historical Indian cultural landmark

Coordinates: 24.9324°N 88.9714°E

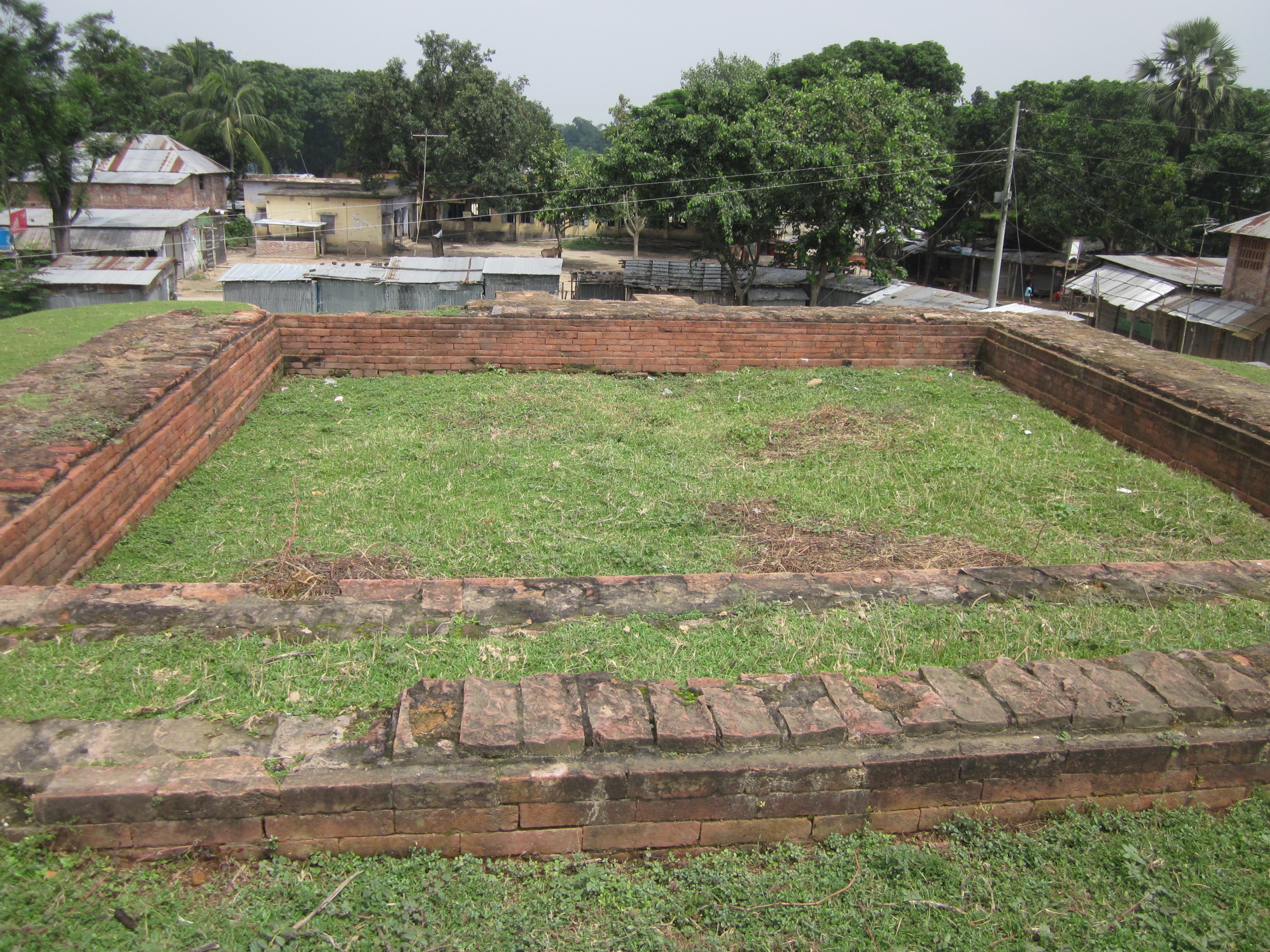
Remains of Halud Vihara

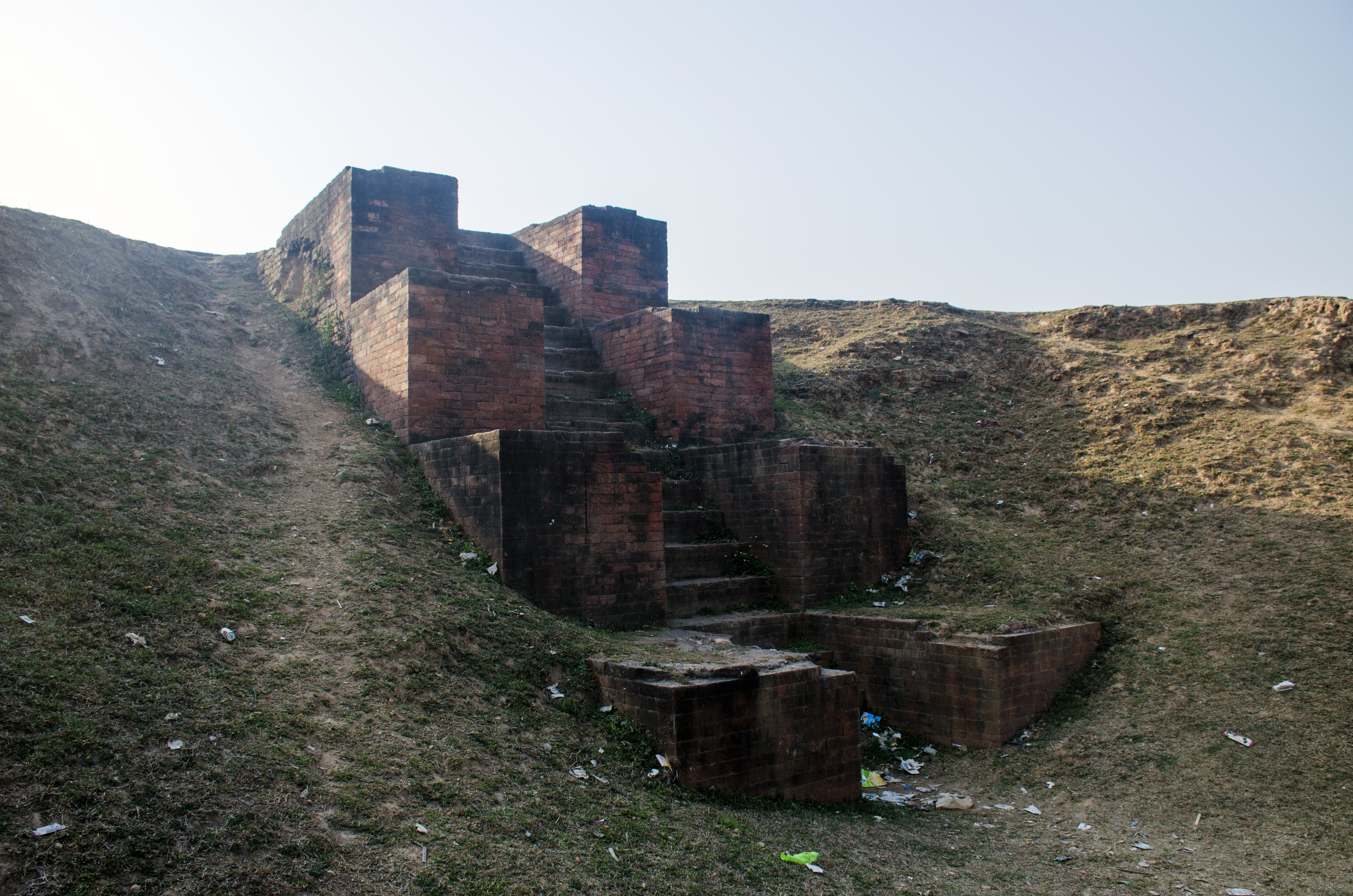
Stairs of Halud Vihar

Halud Vihara (Bengali: হলুদ বিহার) is 14.5 kilometres (9.0 mi) south of the World Heritage Site of Somapura Mahavihara, at Pahapur in the Naogaon District of Bangladesh. The main feature of the site is "a large mound stretching 65 metres (213 ft) in east-west and 40 metres (130 ft) in north-south. It has a height of 10 metres (33 ft). A brick structure has been exposed at the top of the mound that seems to be the remains of a large hall. A flight of stairs has been excavated on the eastern slopes of the mound. There are other mounds and remains of brick structures. Some sculpture has been removed from the site, which has also suffered considerably from the local inhabitants removing bricks for reuse. It is located at Halud Vihara village, which is also locally known as Dvipganj. Excavations show that it was an early Medieval Buddhist site, from a similar time period to Somapura Mahavihara and to the Sitakot Vihara in Nawabganj Upazila of Dinajpur District.

== History ==
At various times, several archaeologists and organizations have visited Halud Bihar and provided considerable information about the area. In 1930 or 1931, Indian archaeologist G.C. Dutt visited the site under the Archaeological Survey of India. In his report, he mentioned that the entire area measures 64.5 meters from east to west and 40.5 meters from north to south, and that the site's elevation is about 10.5 meters above the surrounding land. During this time, a bronze statue of Ganesha about 1 meter in height was discovered at a location in the village. It is believed that the statue was made in the 8th or 9th century.

Archaeologist Qazi Muhammad Meser, in his book titled History of Rajshahi, mentioned that in 1963, a black stone statue of Buddha, several terracotta plaques, and some ancient coins were discovered from the Halud Bihar mound. After the establishment of Bangladesh, the Department of Archaeology of Bangladesh sent former superintendent Harun-or-Rashid to investigate the site in 1974. In his report, he also noted seeing various remains of ancient civilization in the area, including terracotta plaques and stone sculptures.

Later, in 1976, the Department of Archaeology of Bangladesh officially registered the site as an archaeological site and conducted two excavations in 1984 and 1993.

== World Heritage status ==
This site was added to the UNESCO World Heritage Tentative List on February 17, 1999, in the cultural category.

== See also ==
- List of archaeological sites in Bangladesh
