= Department of Archaeology (Bangladesh) =

Bangladesh Archaeological Department

- প্রত্নতত্ত্ব অধিদপ্তর

Department overview
- Formed: 1972; 54 years ago
- Preceding Department: Archaeological Survey of India
- Jurisdiction: Government of Bangladesh
- Headquarters: Agargaon, Dhaka, Bangladesh
- Parent Department: Ministry of Cultural Affairs
- Website: www.archaeology.gov.bd

Department of Archaeology (Bengali: প্রত্নতত্ত্ব অধিদপ্তর, pronounced [baŋladeʃ protnototto ɔdʱidoptor]) is a government agency of Bangladesh. By the Laws of Archaeology 1964 (amended in 1976) this agency is tasked with the conservation and preservation of archaeological sites in the country. Since 2013, the department operates from the Administration Building situated in Agargaon in Dhaka.

== History ==
The organization was first founded in 1861 as a part of the Archaeological Survey of India. After the independence of Bangladesh its office was established in Dhaka. In 1983 regional offices were established in the then 4 divisions including Dhaka as the headquarter by divisional rearrangement.

== Agency Functions ==
Department of Archaeology (Bangladesh) compiles and also conserves the list of archaeological sites and artifacts of Bangladesh. Currently (June 2016) there are 452 archaeological sites under the management of this department. Some of the mentionable among them are: Mahasthangarh, Mainamati, Somapura Mahavihara, Shita Coat Bihar, Nawabganj, Kantajew Temple, Choto Sona Mosque, Sixty Dome Mosque, Vasu Vihara, Barobazar, and Lalbagh Fort. Among these, Somapura Mahavihara and Sixty Dome Mosque have been recognized as World Heritage Sites. Also there are 17 archaeology museums under the administration of this department. The department works to conserve history by discovering ancient cultural elements from remote areas across the country, and repairing and preserving the discovered monuments and exhibiting them.

== Museums ==
Currently there are 17 museums administered by Department of Archaeology.

=== Dhaka Division ===
- Lalbagh Museum
- Panam Nagar
- Baliati Museum
- Mymensingh Museum

=== Rajshahi Division ===
- Paharpur Archaeological Museum
- Bagha Museum
- Archaeological Museum, Mahasthan
- Rabindra Kachharibari Museum
- Patisar Museum
- Chalan Beel Museum

=== Rangpur Division ===
- Tajhat Palace Museum

=== Khulna Division ===
- Khulna Divisional Museum
- Bagerhat Museum
- Shilaidaha Kuthibari Museum
- M.M. Dutt Bari Museum
- Rabindra Complex, Dakkhindihi

=== Chittagong Division ===
- Mainamati Museum
- Ethnological Museum, Chittagong

=== Barisal Division ===
- Sher-e-Bangla Sriti Museum
