= Paharpur Archaeological Museum =

Archaeological museum in Bangladesh

- পাহাড়পুর প্রত্নতাত্ত্বিক জাদুঘর
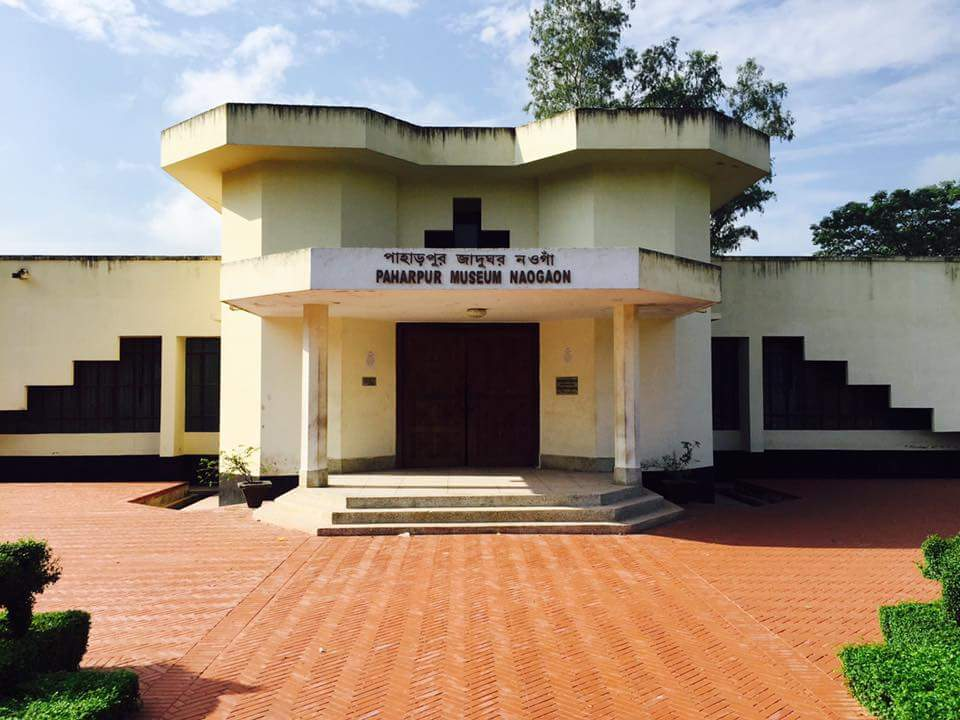
- Established: 1994
- Location: Paharpur Buddhist Vihara, Paharpur, Naogaon, Bangladesh
- Coordinates: 25.031°N 88.9806°E
- Type: Archaeological museum
- Collections: Bust of a Buddha; Terracotta plaque; Decorated brick; Stone statue; Terracotta utensils
- Curator: Muhammad Fazlur Karim
- Owner: Department of Archaeology

Paharpur Archaeological Museum or Paharpur Museum Naogaon is a museum located in Naogaon, Bangladesh. It displays archaeological artifacts collected from the Somapura Mahavihara and its surrounding areas. The museum is located in Paharpur village of Paharpur Union, about 35 km north of Naogaon District and about 12 km south of Joypurhat District. The museum is one of the 21 museums operated by the Bangladesh Department of Archaeology.

== History ==
In the 1960s, the then Department of Archaeology of Pakistan established a museum in a historic Buddhist monastery, Somapura Mahavihara. The monastery was declared a World Heritage Site in 1985. In response, a UNESCO-supported project demolished the old museum in 1994 and built a new museum building with four galleries.

== Collections ==
The artifacts preserved in the Paharpur Museum include a medium-sized bronze bust of a Buddha, terracotta plaques, decorated bricks, stone statues, terracotta amulets, etc. Metal statues collected from the monastery are preserved here. Notable among these are the decorated Hargauri, nude Jain idols, bronze Buddha busts

Also preserved are old copper and silver coins from the 8th to 16th centuries. Other collections include some terracotta female figures, animal portraits, fragments of temple spires, truncated cone-shaped daggers, flat discs, seals, and cylindrical beads. In addition, stepped pyramids, lotus petals, chessboards, and oblong medals with half-bloomed lotuses have also been collected.

=== Preserved statues ===
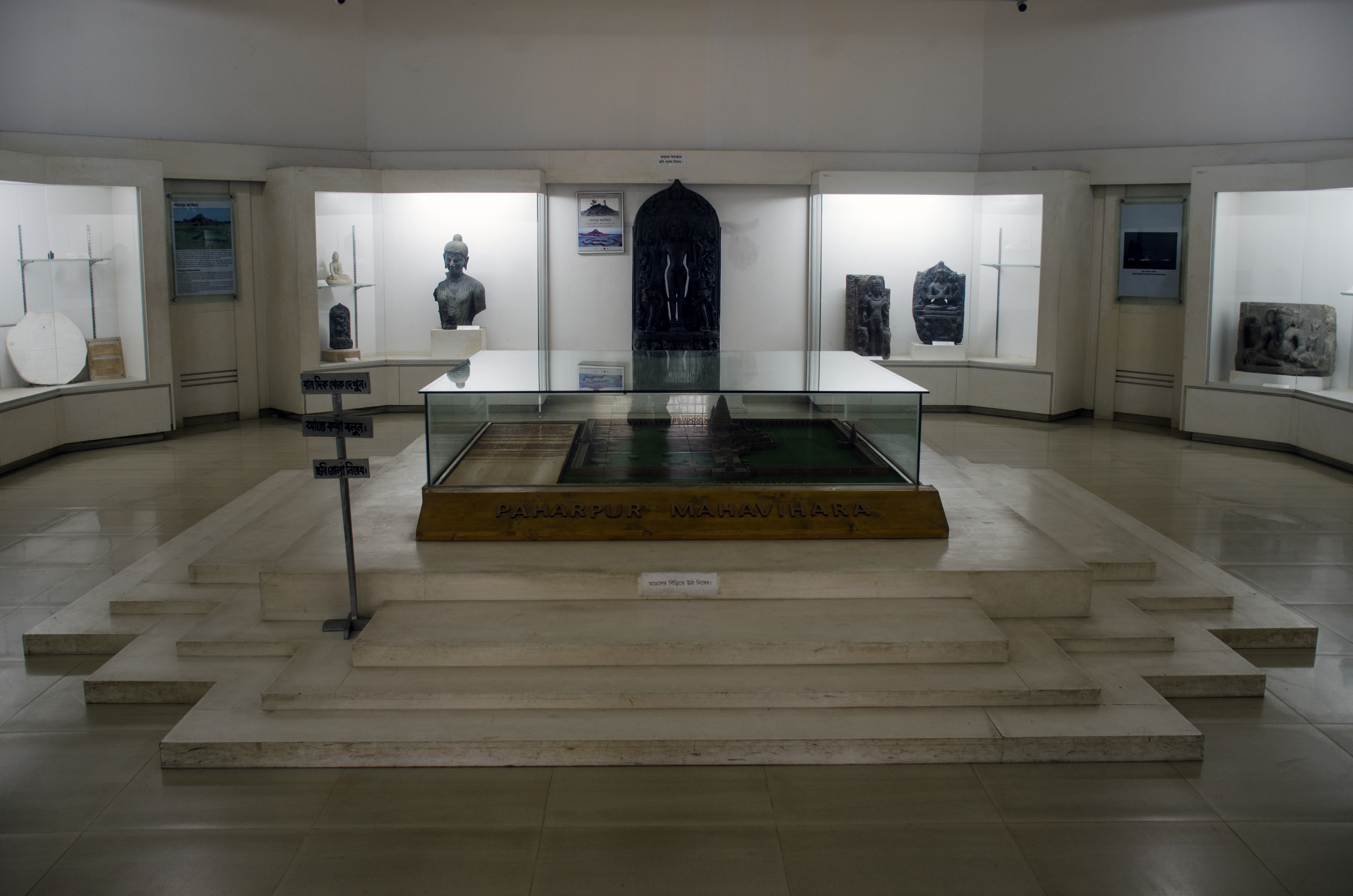
Preserved statues in the museum

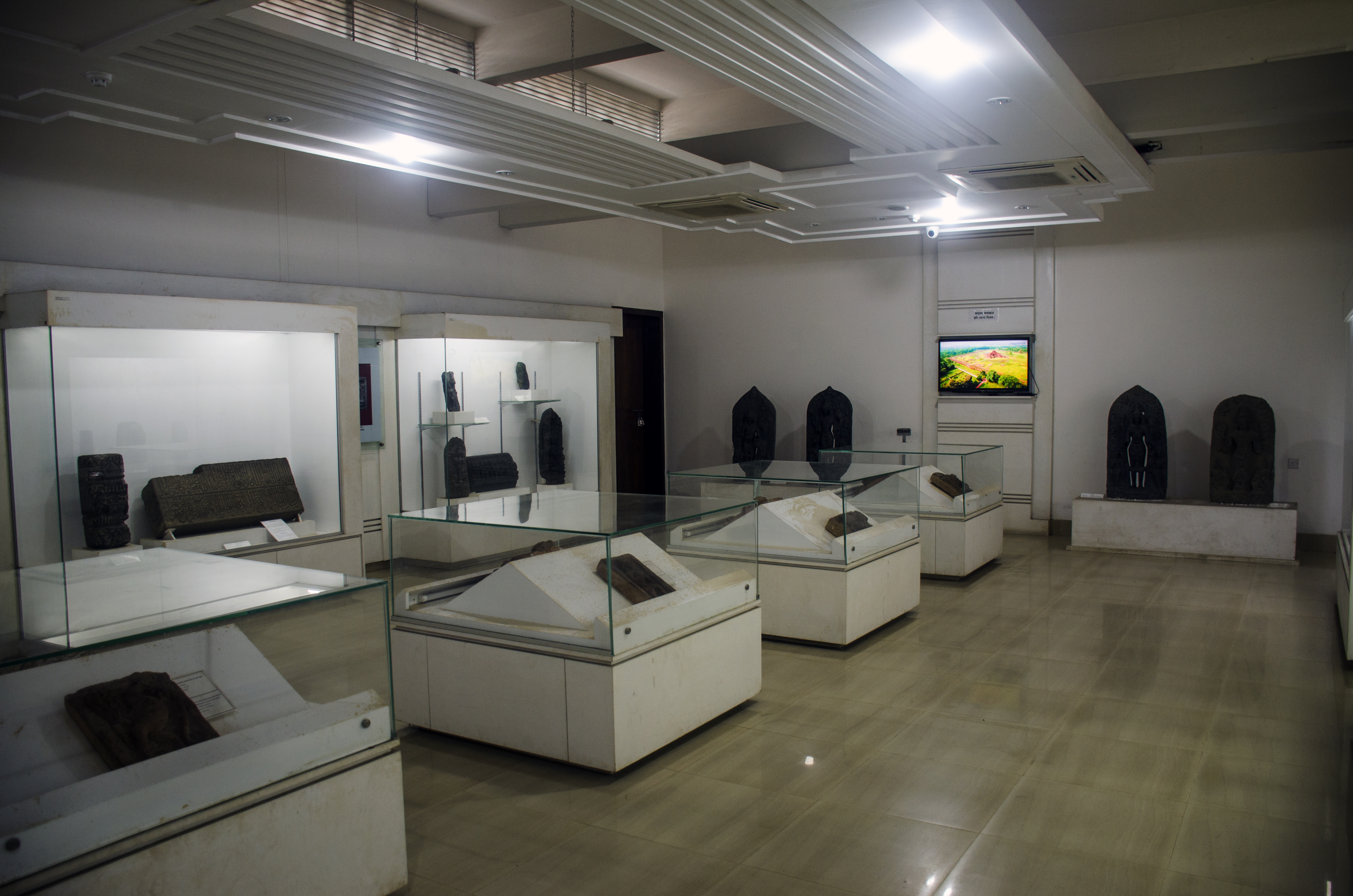
Further preserved statues in the museum

Below are the notable preserved statues in the museum:

- Sandstone Chamunda statue
- Standing Shitala statue made of red stone
- Fragment of Vishnu made of black stone
- Standing Ganesha made of black stone
- Kirti statue made of sandstone
- Oil painting of the Queen of Dubalhati
- Damaged statue of Hargauri
- Broken statue of Lakshmi Narayan made of black stone
- Uma statue made of black stone
- Gauri statue made of sandstone
- Vishnu statue made of sandstone
- Nandi statue made of sandstone
- Vishnu statue made of sandstone
- Surya statue made of sandstone
- Shivlingam made of black stone
- Manasa statue made of sandstone

== Visiting hours ==
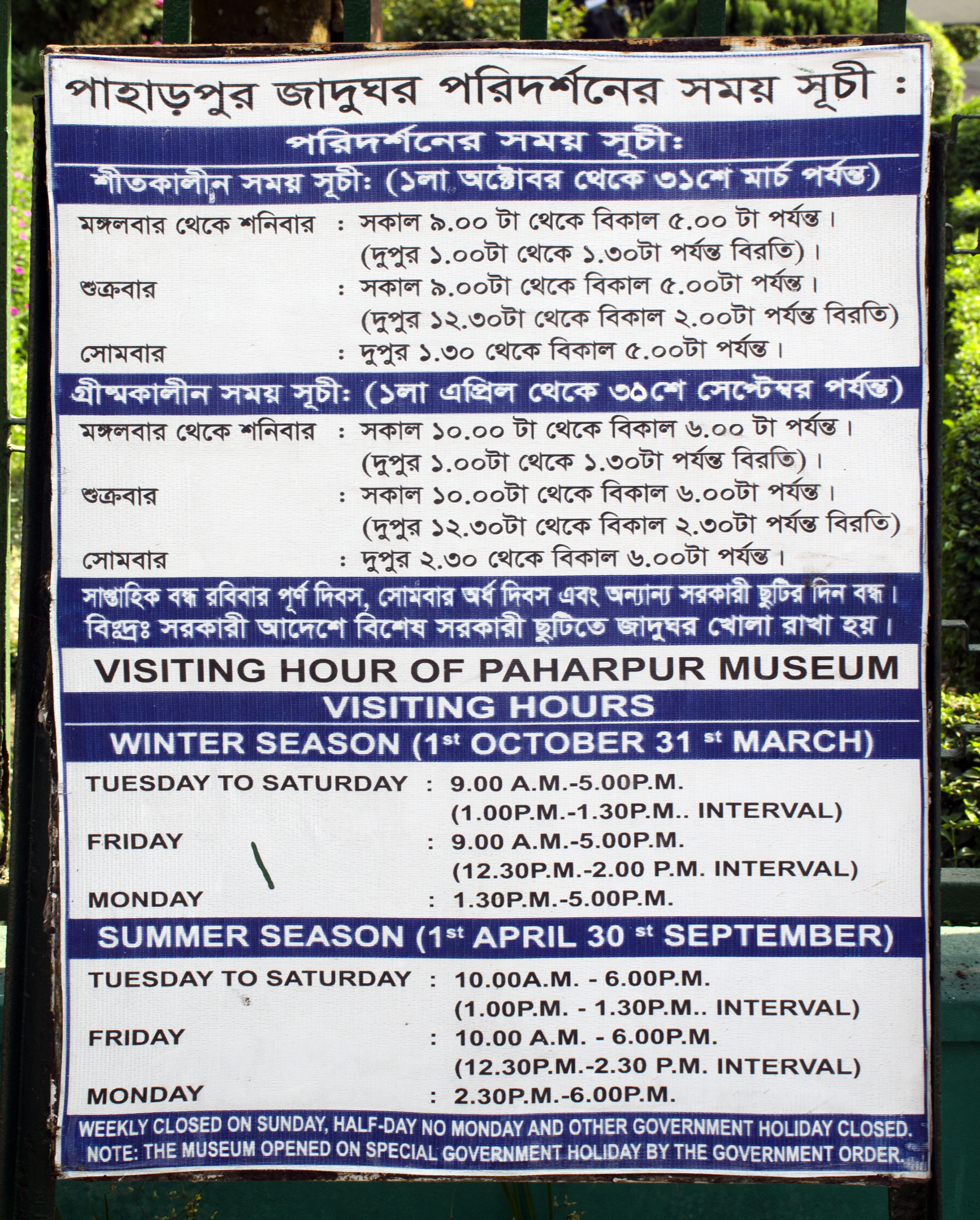
Visiting hours of the museum

The museum attracts 700 to 100 people on a typical working day. The objects kept in the museum can be viewed by paying an entrance fee of 30 BDT. However, tourists can visit the museum for free on special days.

From 1 April to 30 September, the museum is open from 10 am to 6 pm. From 1 October to 31 March, the museum is open from 9 am to 5 pm. It is closed for half an hour every day from 1 pm to 1.30 pm. It is closed on Fridays for Jumah prayers from 12.30 pm to 3 pm. The museum is open on Sundays, public holidays, and Mondays from 2 pm.

== See also ==
- Somapura Mahavihara
- Department of Archaeology (Bangladesh)
- Lists of World Heritage Sites
