= Sitakot Vihara =

Coordinates: 25.41426°N 89.05155°E

- সীতাকোট বিহার (Bengali)
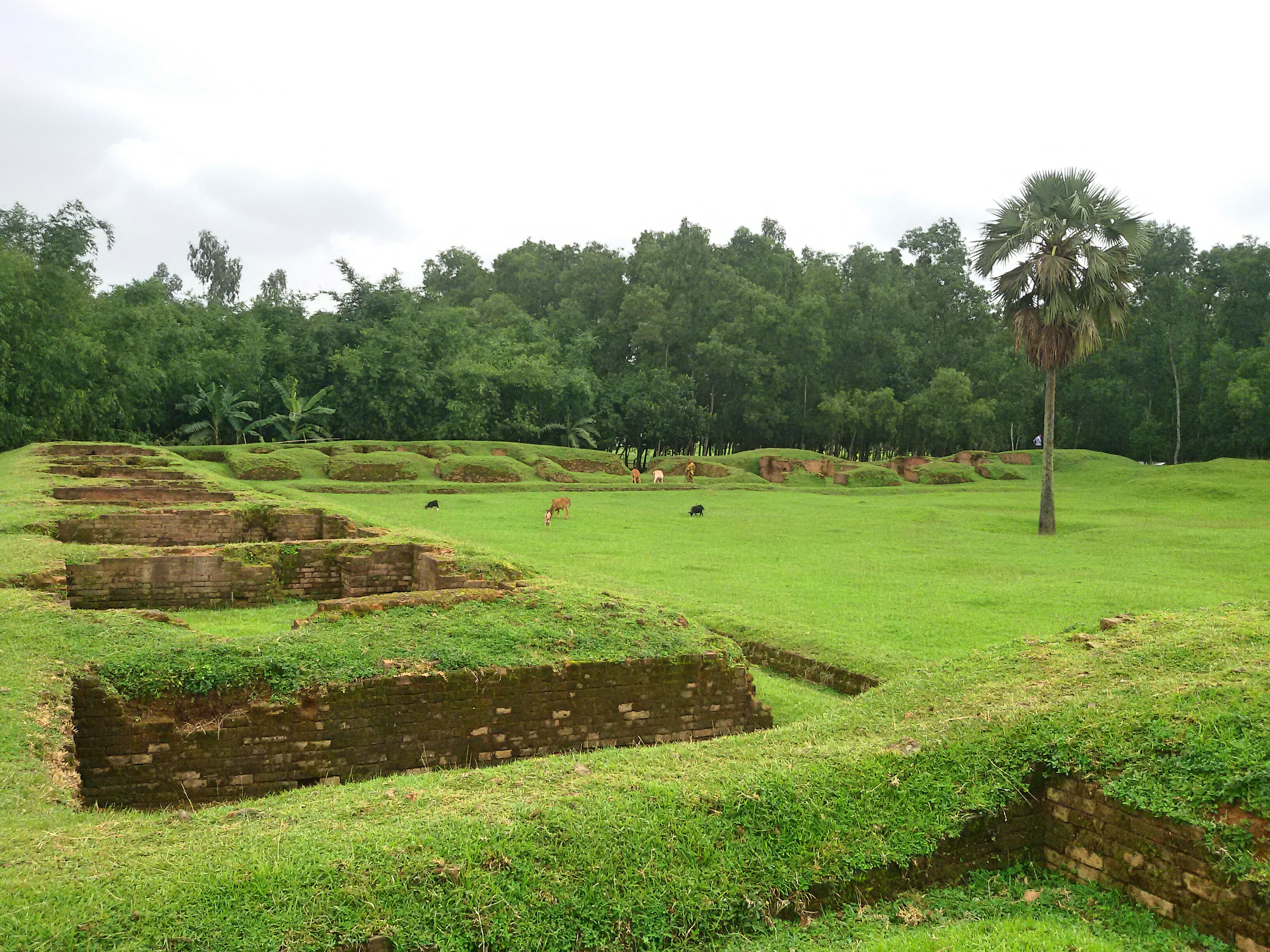

- Location within Bangladesh
- Location: Nawabganj Upazila Dinajpur, Bangladesh

History
- Built: 6th century CE
- Built for: Buddhist monastic community

Site notes
- Architectural style: Buddhist

Sitakot Vihara (Bengali: সীতাকোট বিহার, Sitakot Buddhist Vihara) is an archaeological site located in Nawabganj Upazila in Dinajpur District, Bangladesh. Excavations conducted in 1968 and 1972–1973 revealed the remains of an ancient Buddhist monastery at the site. The monastery is generally dated to the 7th–8th century CE, although an earlier date has also been proposed. It forms part of the wider Buddhist archaeological landscape of northern Bangladesh, which includes the nearby Somapura Mahavihara and Halud Vihara.

Archaeological finds from the site include bronze images of the Buddhist bodhisattvas Padmapani and Manjushri, as well as terracotta objects, ornamental bricks, pottery fragments and other artefacts. These discoveries provide evidence of Buddhist art and religious activity within the monastery.

Sitakot Vihara is significant for the study of Buddhist monasticism and early medieval Buddhist architecture in Bengal. Its architectural arrangement and archaeological finds provide evidence of the development of Buddhist monastic institutions in the region. Although it is often discussed alongside Somapura Mahavihara and Halud Vihara, the chronology and architectural features of the three establishments are not identical.

== Architecture ==
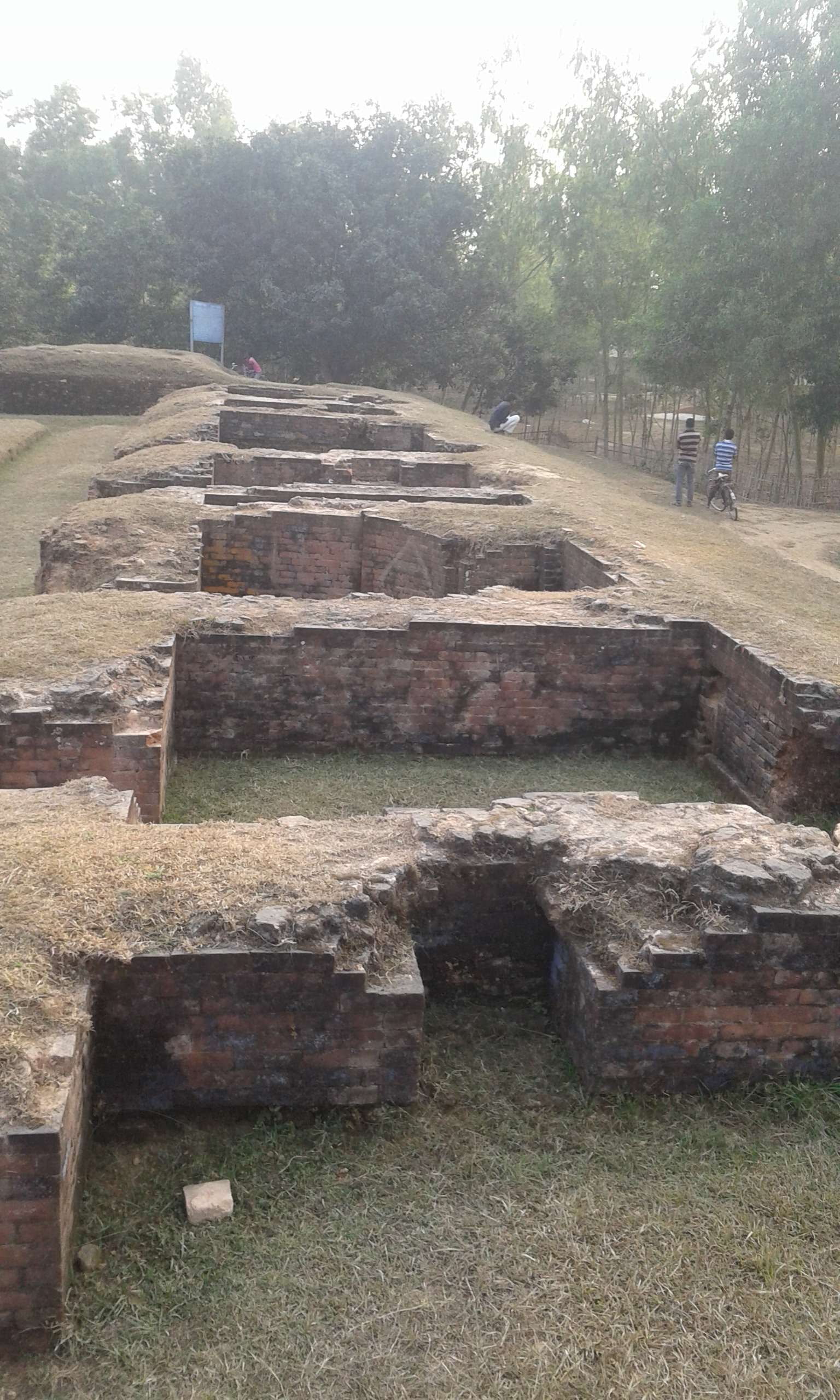

The monastery was built on a square area of 65 meters.

On the northern and southern sides there was large open space inside the boundary. The outer gateway was on the northern side and there were two guardrooms inside the boundary. The inner gateway allows entry to an entrance hall. The hall is attached with monastic cells. There were 41 cells in this monastery: 8 in the northern wing and 11 cells each in the three other wings. The cells were almost equal in size (3.66 m by 3.35 m). The thickness of the front walls of the cells were 1.07 m, back walls 2.59 m and partition walls 0.91-1.22 m. Each cell has a doorway in front side and niches on three side walls.

A 2.59 meter wide verandah ran through the perimeter of the monastery and the cells were connected to it through a doorway of 1.68 meter length and 1.07 meter width.

There is a courtyard in the middle of the monastery that measure 42.38 meter by *41.16 meter. Three rooms located in the middle of the east, west and south wings were used as prayer rooms.

== Artifacts found ==
Two bronze images were found on the site. One is of Bodhisattva Padmapani and the other of Bodhisattva Manjushri. Ink pots, terra cotta toys, ornamental bricks, and a lot of pot shards were also unearthed during the excavation.

== Protection ==
The site is under protection of the Department of Archaeology and Museums, Government of Bangladesh. The site is not well maintained, and restoration work is needed.

== See also ==
- Somapura Mahavihara
- Halud Vihara

== Gallery ==
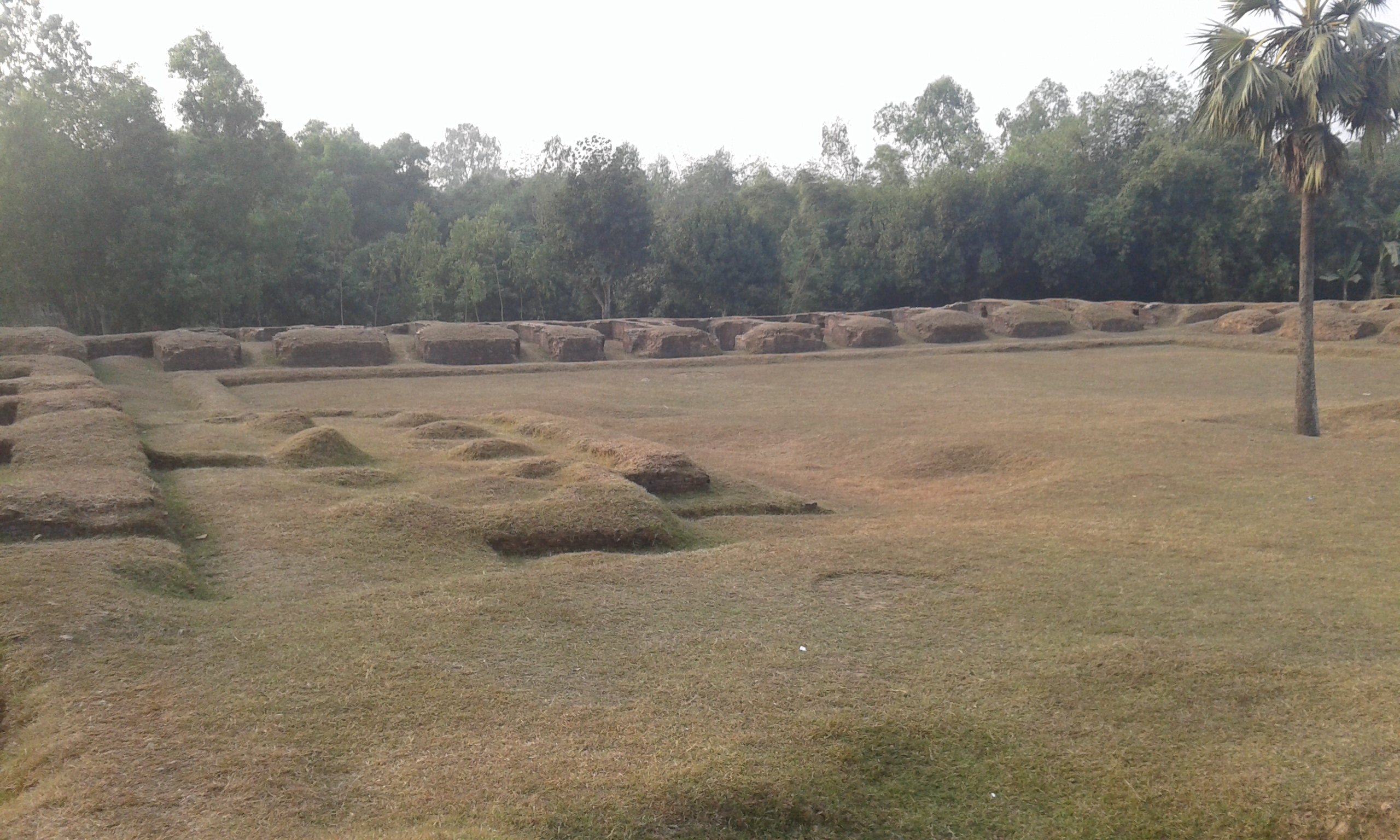

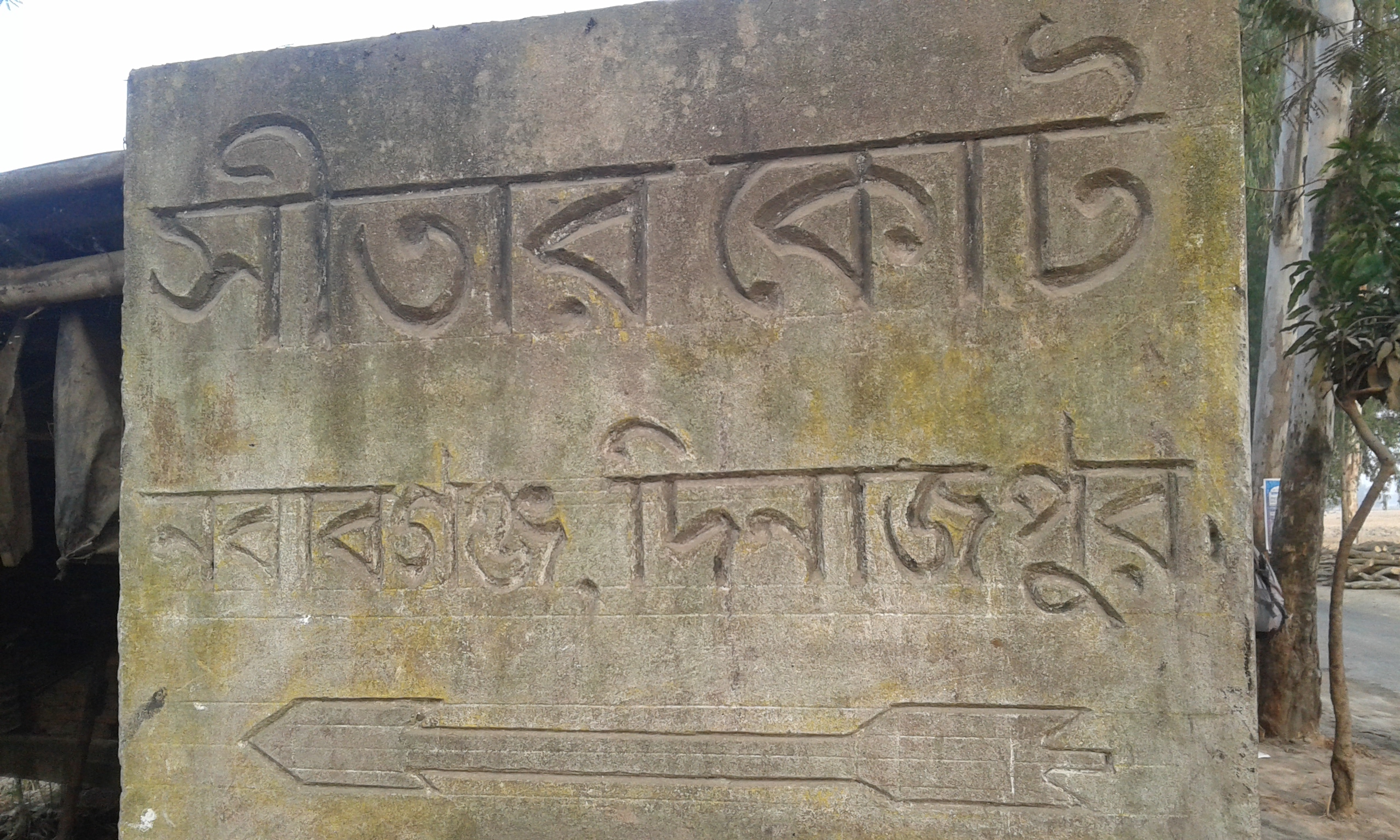
