= Somapura Mahavihara =

Ancient Buddhist monastery in modern day Bangladesh

Sompura Mahavihara Paharpur Buddhist Vihara
- সোমপুর মহাবিহার পাহাড়পুর বৌদ্ধবিহার
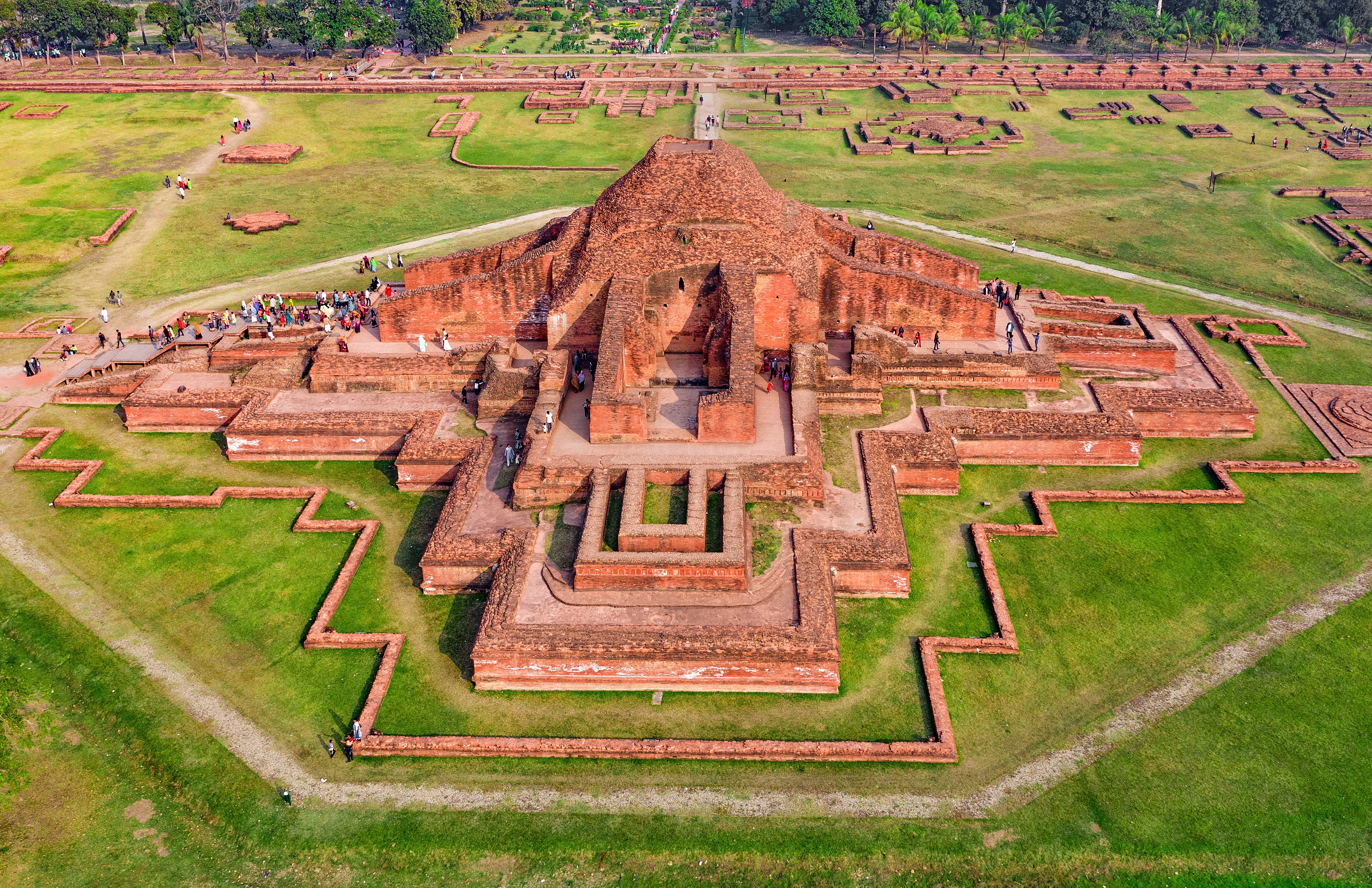
- View of the central shrine

Religion
- Affiliation: Buddhism
- Sect: Mahayana and Vajrayana

Location
- Location: Naogaon, Rajshahi, Bangladesh
- Interactive map of Sompura Mahavihara; Paharpur Buddhist Vihara
- Coordinates: 25°01′52″N 88°58′37″E

Architecture
- UNESCO World Heritage Site
- Official name: Ruins of the Buddhist Vihara Aloo at Paharpur
- Type: Cultural
- Criteria: i, ii, vi
- Designated: 1985 (9th session)
- Reference no.: 322
- Region: Asia-Pacific

Somapura Mahavihara (Bengali: সোমপুর মহাবিহার, romanized: Sōmpur Môhābihār), also known as Paharpur Buddhist Vihara (Bengali: পাহাড়পুর বৌদ্ধবিহার, romanized: Pāhāṛpur Bôuddhôbihār), is a major Mahayana and Vajrayana Buddhist monastery (mahavihara) in Paharpur, Badalgachhi, Naogaon, Bangladesh. It is among the best known Buddhist viharas in the Indian subcontinent and one of the most important archaeological sites in the country. It was designated as a UNESCO World Heritage Site in 1985.

It is one of the most famous examples of pre-Islamic Bengali architecture. It dates from a period to the nearby Halud Vihara and to the Sitakot Vihara in Nawabganj, Dinajpur.

== History ==
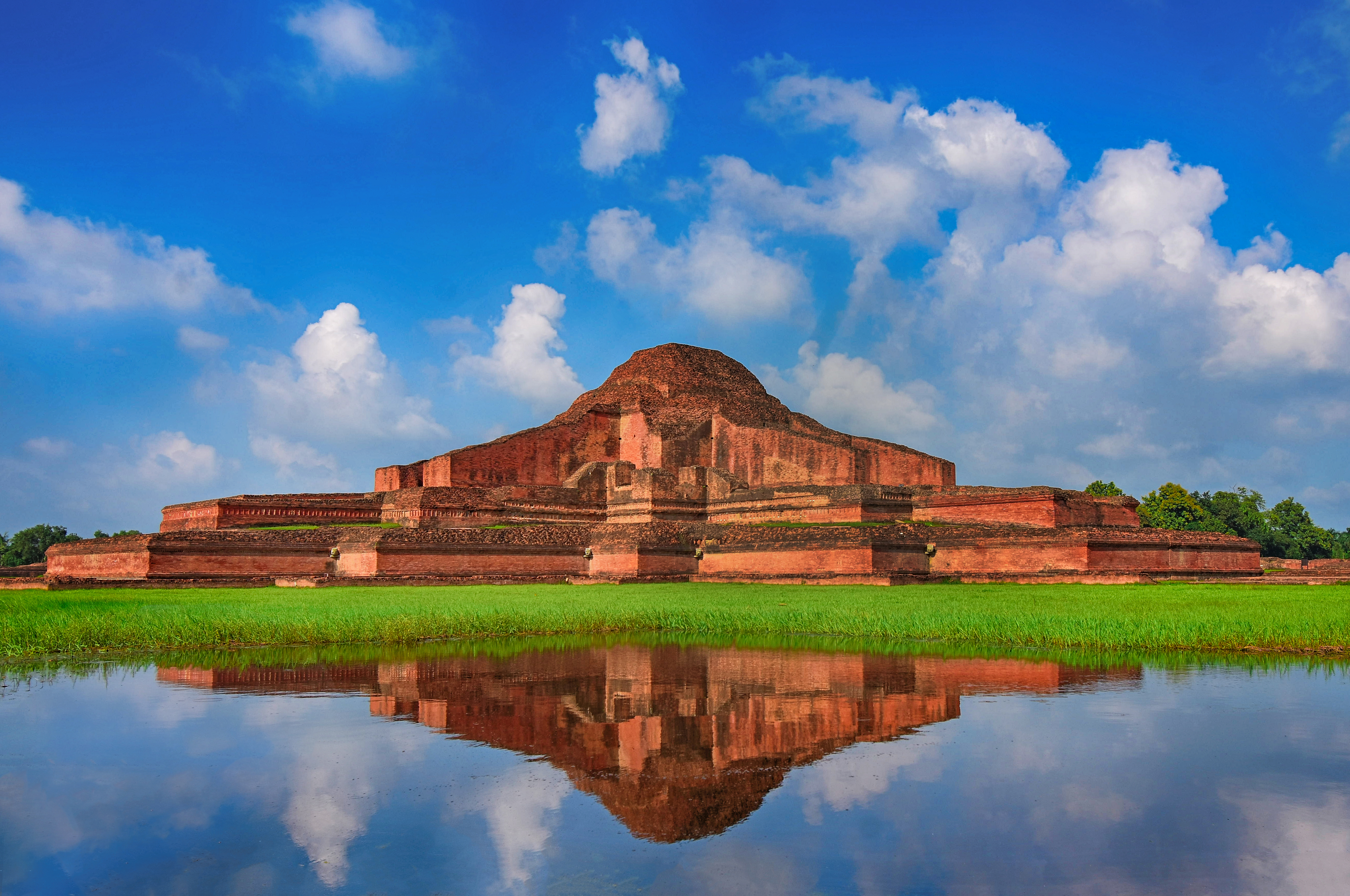

A number of monasteries grew up during the Pāla period in ancient India in the eastern regions of the Indian subcontinent, comprising Bengal and Magadha. According to Tibetan sources, five great Mahaviharas (universities) stood out: Vikramashila, the premier university of the era; Nalanda, past its prime but still illustrious; Somapura Mahavihara; Odantapurā; and Jaggadala. The mahaviharas formed a network; "all of them were under state supervision" and there existed "a system of co-ordination among them ... it seems from the evidence that the different seats of Buddhist learning that functioned in eastern India under the Pāla were regarded together as forming a network, an interlinked group of institutions," and it was common for great scholars to move easily from position to position among them. Atisa, who resided at the Somapura Mahavihara (the largest university in ancient India at that time), traveled from Bengal to Tibet to preach Buddhism. The earliest form of the Bengali language began to emerge during the eighth century.

The excavation at Paharpur, and the finding of seals bearing the inscription Shri-Somapure-Shri-Dharmapaladeva-Mahavihariyarya-bhiksu-sangghasya, has identified the Somapura Mahavihara as built by the second Pala king Dharmapala (circa 781–821) of Pāla Dynasty. Tibetan sources, including Tibetan translations of Dharmakayavidhi and Madhyamaka Ratnapradipa, Taranatha's history and Pag-Sam-Jon-Zang, mention that Dharmapala's successor Devapala (circa 810–850) built it after his conquest of Varendra. The Paharpur pillar inscription bears the mention of 5th regnal year of Devapala's successor Mahendrapala (circa 850–854) along with the name of Bhiksu Ajayagarbha. Taranatha's Pag Sam Jon Zang records that the monastery was repaired during the reign of Mahipala (circa 995–1043 AD).

Jatvarma of Varman dynasty attacked Varendra in 11th century with hostility towards Kaivarta king Divya and Buddhism. Though the Kaivarta regime did not seem to suffer any loss, a part of the Mahavihara was destroyed by fire set by Jatvarma's army.

Over time Atisha's spiritual preceptor, Ratnākaraśānti, served as a sthavira of the vihara, Mahapanditacharya Bodhibhadra served as a resident monk, and other scholars spent part of their lives at the monastery, including Kalamahapada, Viryendra and Karunashrimitra. Many Tibetan monks visited the Somapura between the 9th and 12th centuries.

During the rule of the Sena dynasty in the second half of the 12th century the vihara started to decline for the last time. One scholar observes, "The ruins of the temple and monasteries at Paharpur show no clear signs of large-scale destruction. Their decline—whether through abandonment or damage—likely occurred amid the widespread unrest and population displacement following the Muslim invasions."

A copperplate dated to 159 Gupta Era (479 AD) discovered in 1927 in the northeast corner of the monastery, mentions donation of a Brahmin couple to Jain Acharya Guhanandi of Pancha-stupa Nikaya at Vata Gohli, identifiable as the neighbouring village of Goalapara.

== Architecture ==
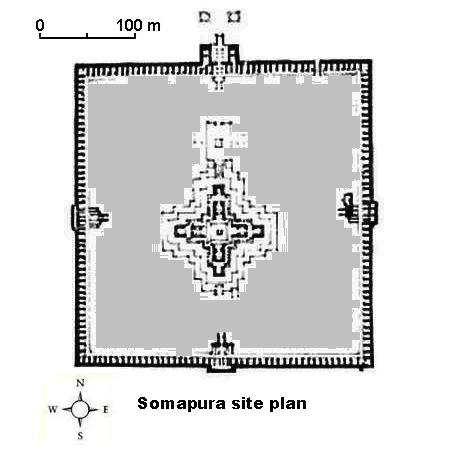
Site map

The quadrangular structure consists of 177 cells and a traditional Buddhist stupa in the centre. The rooms were used by the monks for accommodation and meditation. In addition to the large number of stupas and shrines of various sizes and shapes, terracotta plaques, stone sculptures, inscriptions, coins, ceramics etc, have been discovered in this site.

The site houses the architectural remains of a vast Buddhist monastery, Somapura Mahavihara, covering 11 hectares (27 acres). It was an important intellectual centre for Dharmic Traditions such as Buddhists, Jains and Hindus alike. The 8.5-hectare (21-acre) complex has 177 cells, viharas, numerous stupas, temples and a number of other ancillary buildings. The outside walls with ornamental terracotta plaques still display the influence of these three religions.

In acreage, Somapura was the largest of the mahaviharas. According to Sukumar Dutt, the temple dominating the complex was "strongly reminiscent of Buddhist temples of Burma, Java and Cambodia, reproducing the cruciform basement, terraced structure with inset chambers and gradually dwindling pyramid form... during the age of the Palas some sort of intercourse between eastern India and south-east Asia existed." Another commented, "there can be no doubt that this style of architecture has most profoundly influenced that of Burma, Java and Cambodia. The nearest approximation to the plan and the superstructure of the Paharpur temple is afforded by the temples known as Chandi Loro Jongrang and Chandi Sevu of Prambanam in Central Java."

=== Central temple ===
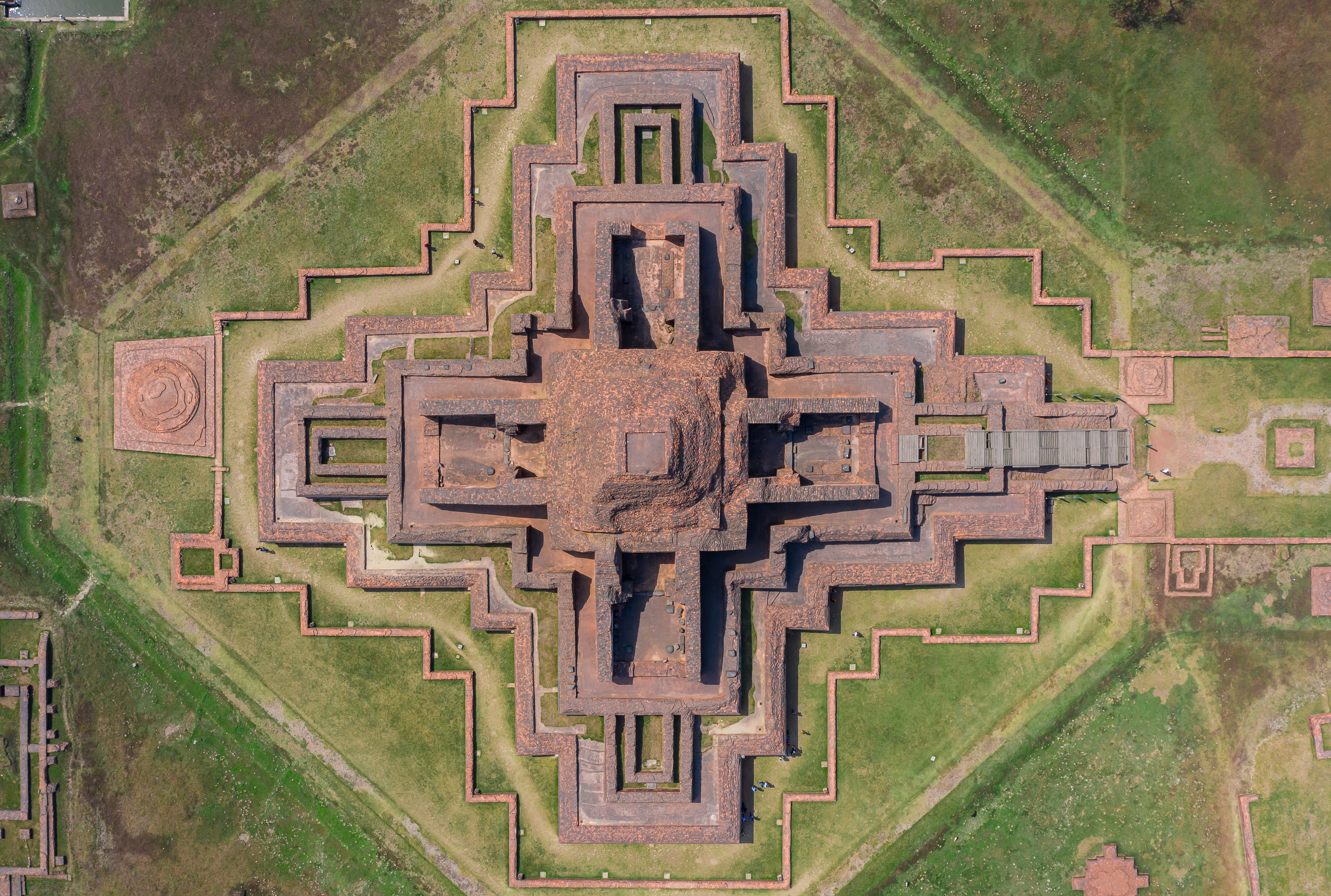
Aerial view

The purpose of this central structure at the midst of the courtyard remains unsolved since its discovery. Hence, most of the debates generated hitherto on the architecture of Sompur Mahavihara are centered on the identification its missing superstructure. The reason may be manifold, but the most important one is the non-availability of substantial amount of first-hand resource including a comprehensive architectural documentation at the disposal of the researchers. There are different arguments regarding the terminating top of the central structure of Sompur Mahavihara.

Consequently, most of the works done so far are mainly based on the findings of the archaeological excavation and studying the artefacts from the archaeological perspective. The first study on this monument with documentation was by archaeologist K. N. Dikhshit in his Paharpur, Memoirs of Archaeological Survey in India (1938). Dikshit was concerned with documentation of the archaeological findings and concentrated on their interpretation and analysis. He attempted to suggest a probable architectural treatment of the missing parts of the structure through studying the archaeological remains. Till today, this study is considered as the most authentic record of the Sompur Mahavihara.

Prudence R. Myer published the first of such studies in 1969 as a journal paper, in which she proposed the missing superstructure as a stupa and illustrated the possible three-dimensional articulations. Myer embarked on her proposal through a diachronic study of the stupa and stupa shrines in India. She took Sompura Mahavihara as an example to elaborate her study and produced a conjectural restoration of the central structure in support of her analysis.

The second work was published around thirty years after Myer's proposition. A team of architects (Note: Team members were Md Ali Naqi, Ziaul Islam, Md. Shoeb Bhuiyan and Catherine Daisy Gomes) from Khulna University led by Mohammed Ali Naqi has proposed another theoretical reconstruction of the central structure as well as some parts of the peripheral block (mainly the entrance hall) in 1999. This work was also presented in the "International Seminar on Elaboration of an Archaeological Research Strategy for Paharpur World Heritage Site and Its Environment" jointly organised by UNESCO and Department of Archaeology of Bangladesh in 2004. Muhammad Ali Naqi proposed a temple-like spire at the top by considering the central mound as a 'Stupa-Shrine' with a 'Shikhara' type stupa in his reconstruction.

In 2012 Mohammad Habib Reza through a contextual analysis of the early Buddhist architecture of Bengal in his doctoral thesis proposes: the core of Pahāŗpur vihāra was similar to pañcharatna temple crown and with four more crowns over the maņdapas it should have looked like the Ānanda temple of Pagan; however, due to its earlier construction period its appearance was more flat than the Ānanda temple.

== Protection ==
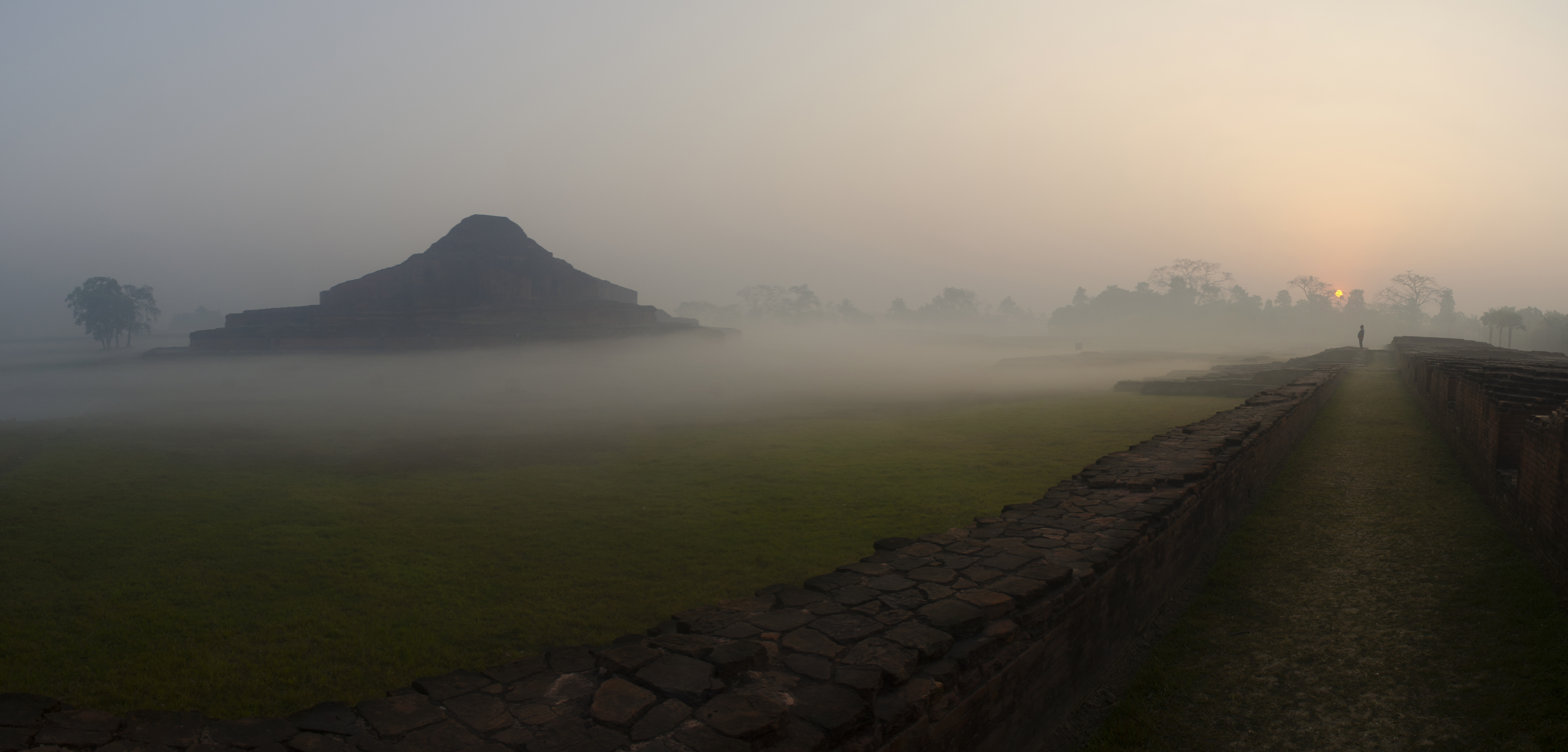
Sunrise at Somapura Mahavihar (Paharpur)

Somapura was designated a UNESCO World Heritage Site in 1985. Since then, a series of UNESCO missions have regularly visited the site and helped with the project. Moreover, the UN body prepared a master plan, involving US$5.6 million. A museum was built near the monastery for public display and research.

The terracotta artworks in the site have suffered from serious damage as a result of "lack of proper maintenance, shortage of manpower, fund constraint and heavy rainfall and the major problem is the corruption in Bangladesh." Furthermore, poor water drainage accompanied by high levels of salinity in the soils has contributed to decay the terracotta sculptures. Other threats include uncontrolled vegetation, vandalism, climate conditions, and public trespassing and encroachment.

Recent scholarship suggests that the management of Somapura Mahavihara has historically favored "museumification", the preservation of physical remains, at the expense of its intangible spiritual significance, calling for a shift that recognizes the site as a living sacred landscape rather than a static archaeological relic.

== Gallery ==
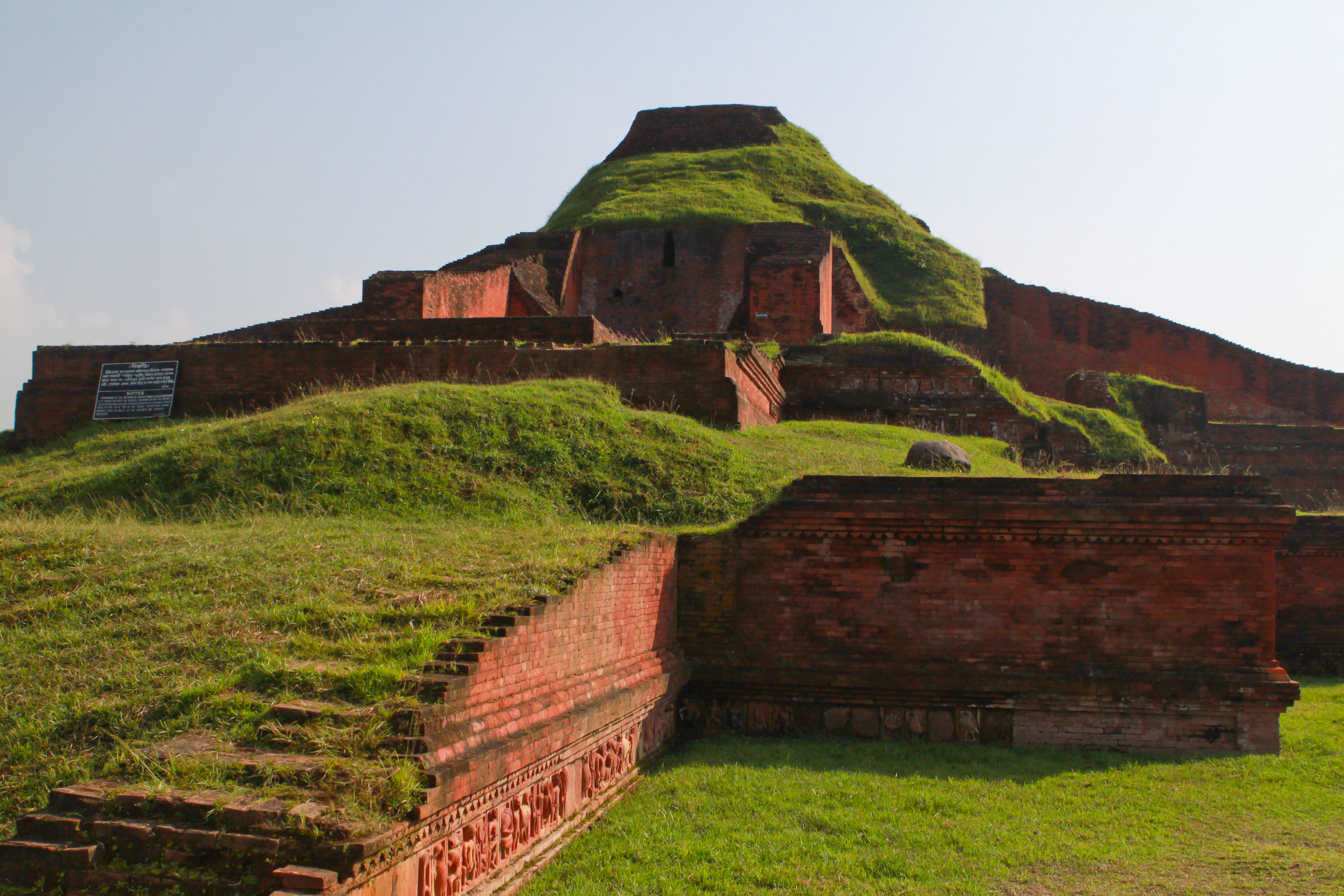
Structures in Somapura Mahavihara complex

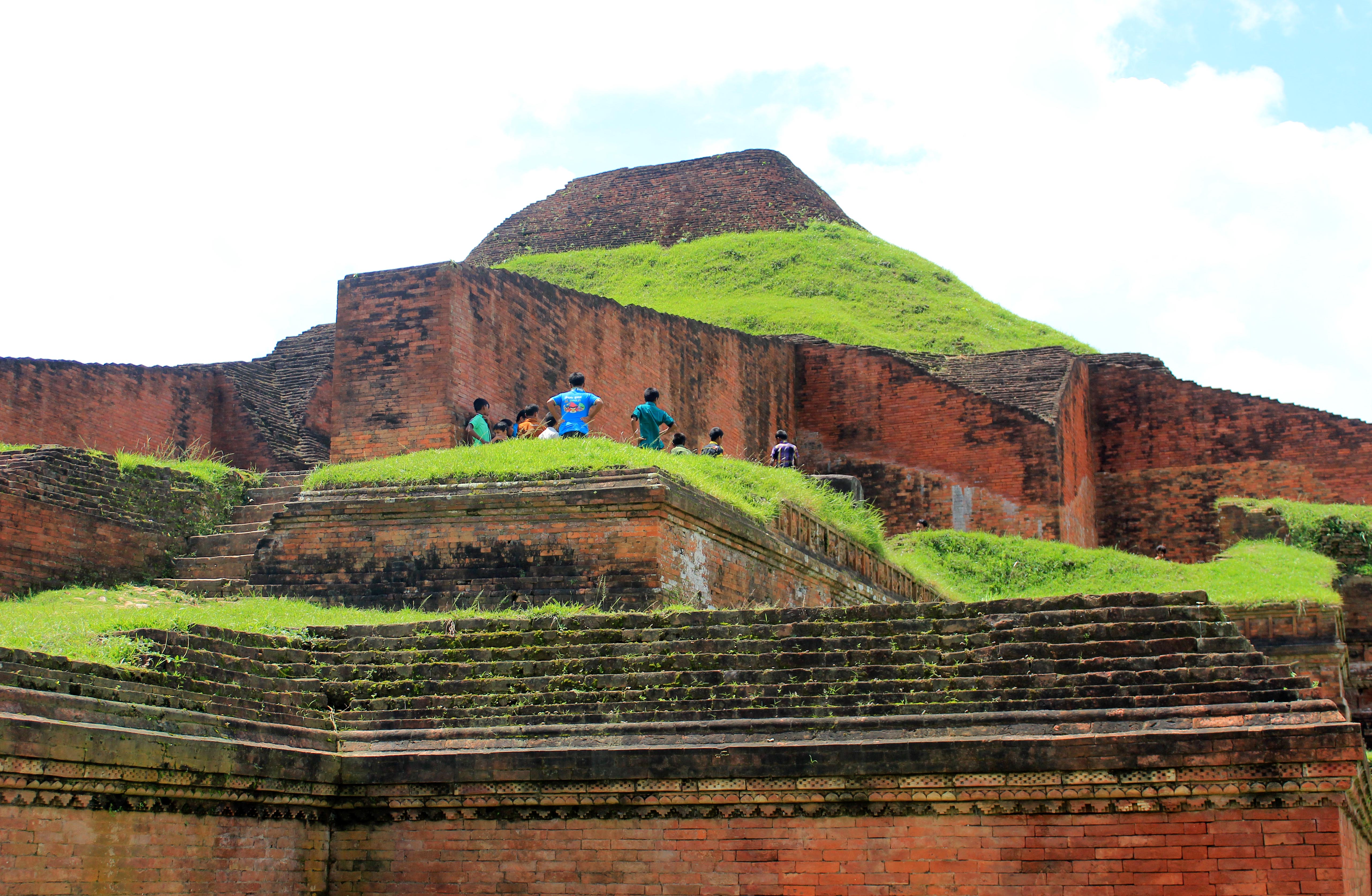
Paharpur with green grass

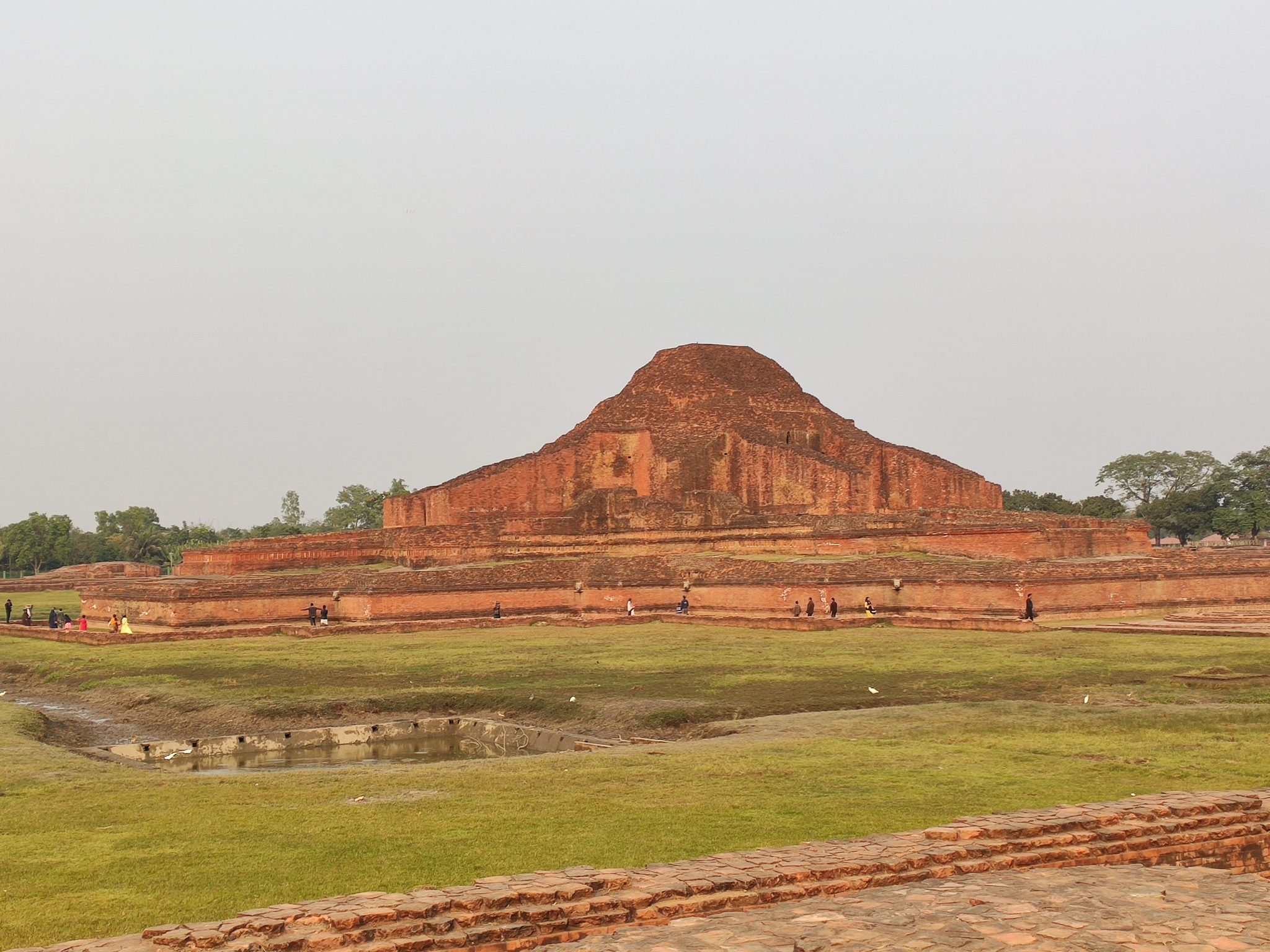
Sompur Mahavihara (Paharpur)

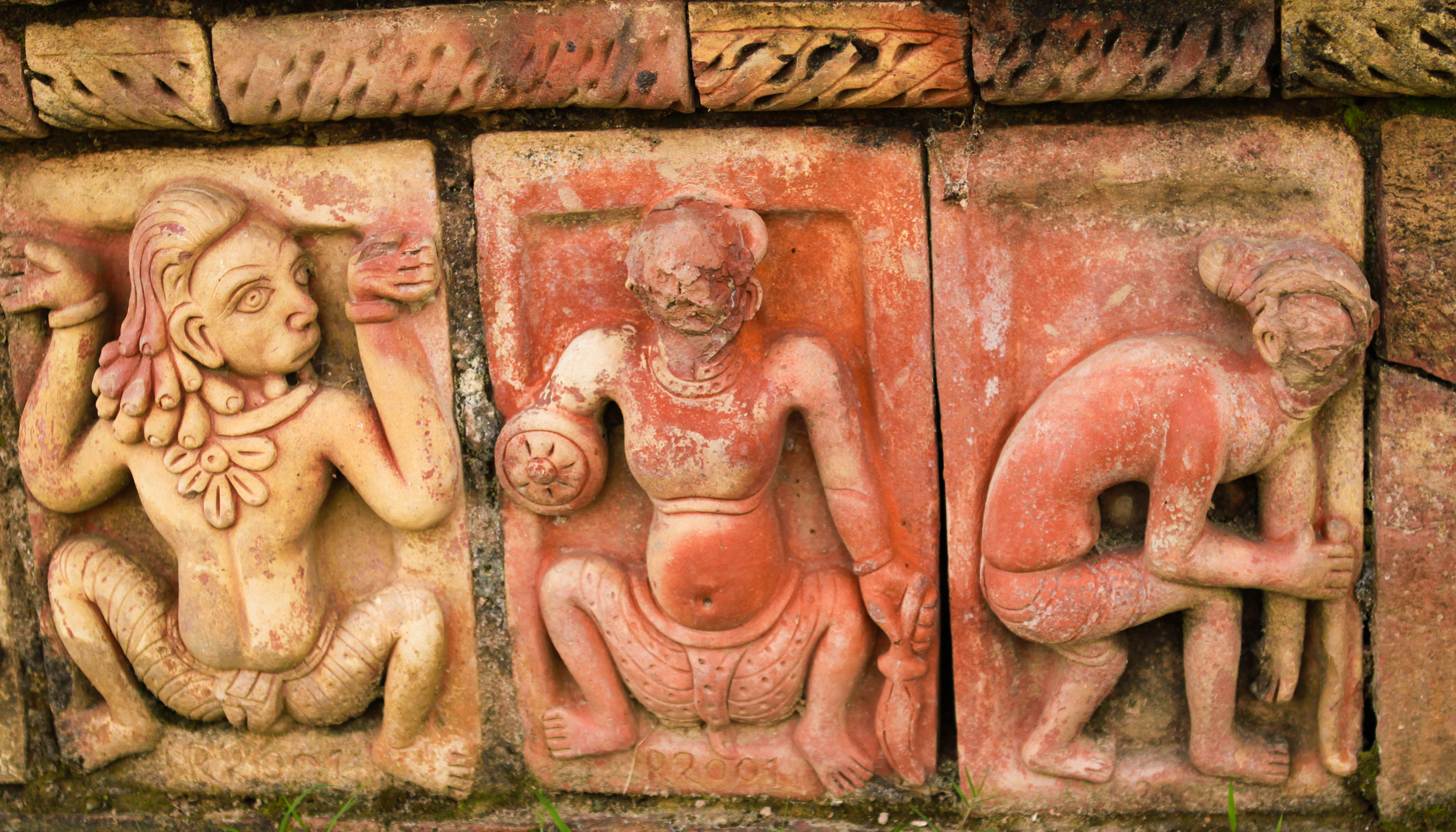
Bottom of Central Shrine

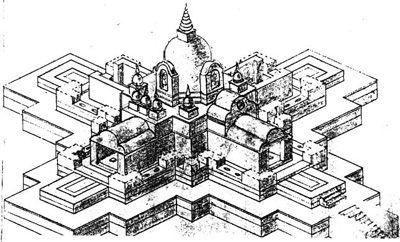
Model by Mohammed Ali Naqi

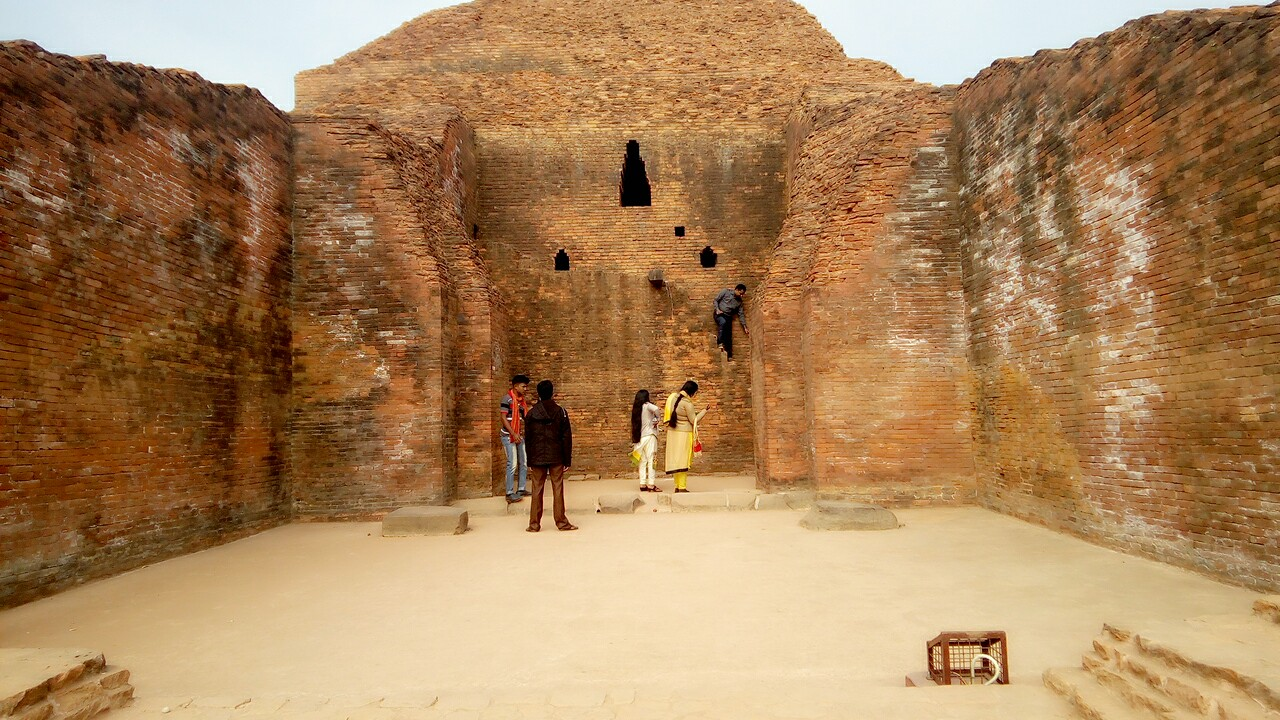
Inner part of the vihar

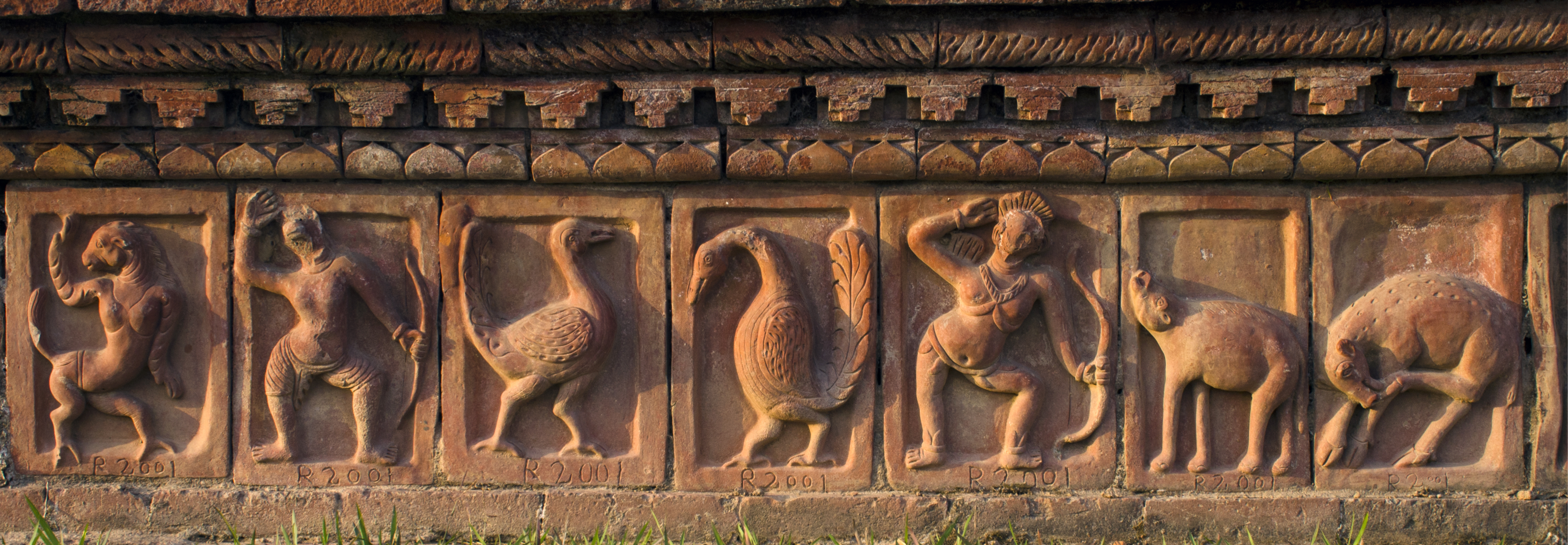
Panels (replica)

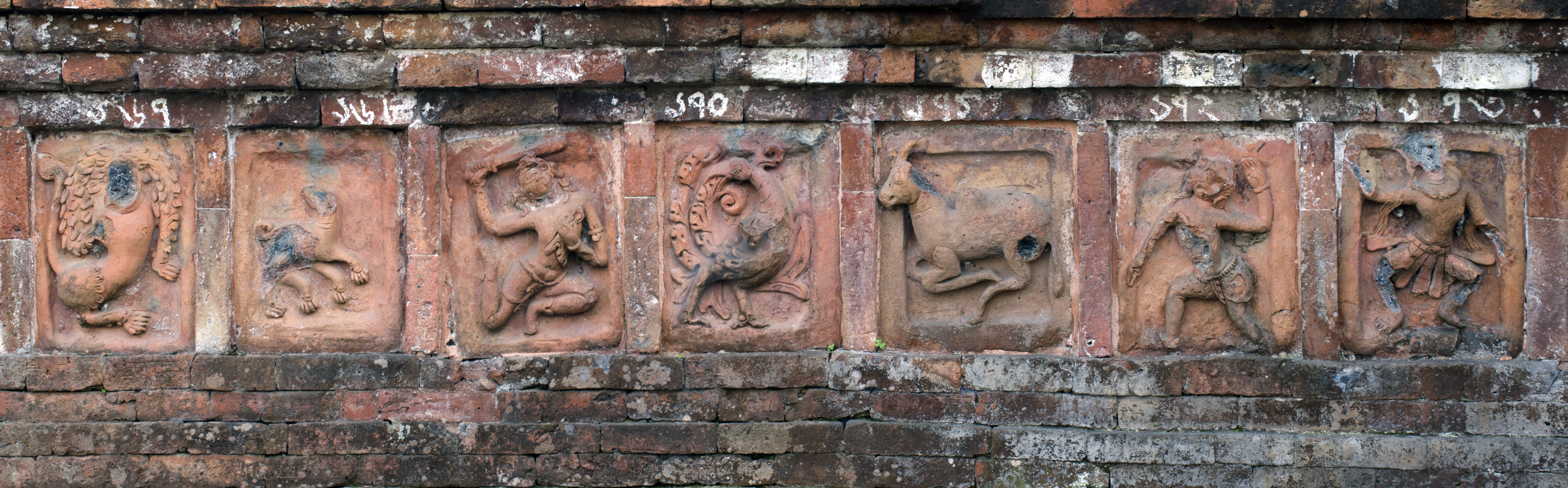
Panels (original)

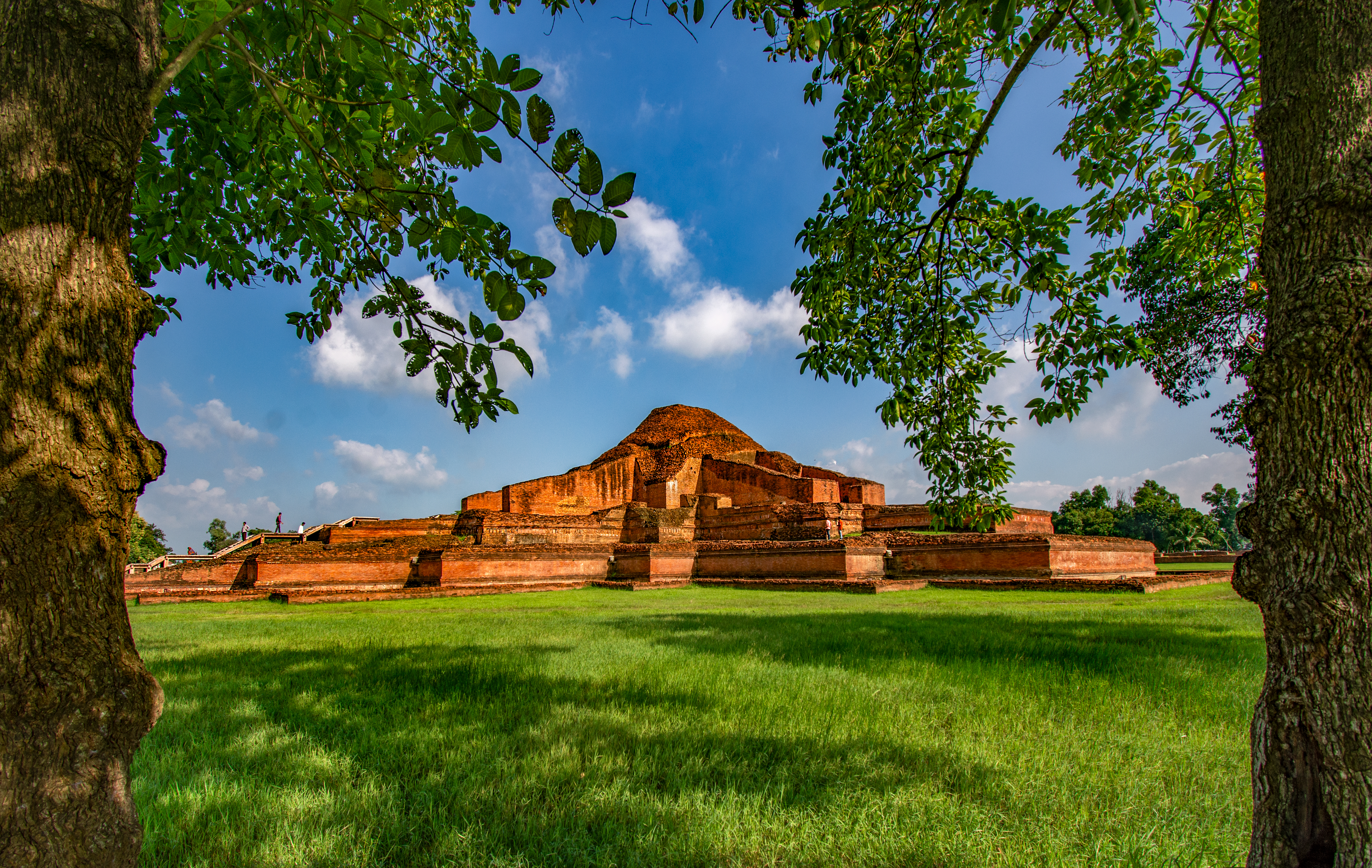
Paharpur

== See also ==
- List of World Heritage Sites in Bangladesh
- List of Buddhist viharas in Bangladesh
- List of colossal sculpture in situ
- Bikrampur Vihara
- Wari-Bateshwar ruins
- Bhitagarh
- List of archaeological sites in Bangladesh
- Paharpur Archaeological Museum
