= List of Intangible Cultural Heritage elements in Bangladesh =

The United Nations Educational, Scientific and Cultural Organisation (UNESCO) intangible cultural heritage elements are the non-physical traditions and practices performed by a people. As part of a country's cultural heritage, they include celebrations, festivals, performances, oral traditions, music, and the making of handicrafts. The "intangible cultural heritage" is defined by the Convention for the Safeguarding of Intangible Cultural Heritage, drafted in 2003 and took effect in 2006. Inscription of new heritage elements on the UNESCO Intangible Cultural Heritage Lists for their protection and safeguard is determined by the Intergovernmental Committee for the Safeguarding of Intangible Cultural Heritage, an organisation established by the convention.

Bangladesh ratified the convention on 11 June 2009. As of 2025, there are six UNESCO Intangible Cultural Heritages in the country.

== Intangible Cultural Heritage of Humanity ==
+ Transnational element

=== Representative List ===
Name	Image	Year	No.	Description
Baul songs		2008	00107	The Baul are a group of mystic minstrels of mixed elements of Sufism and Vaishnava Sahajiya from different parts of Bangladesh.
Traditional art of Jamdani weaving		2013	00879	Jamdani is a fine muslin textile (figured with different patterns) produced for centuries in South Rupshi of Narayanganj district on the bank of Shitalakshya River.
Mangal Shobhajatra on Pahela Baishakh		2016	01091	Mangal Shobhajatra is a mass procession that takes place at dawn on the first day of the Bengali New Year.
Traditional art of Shital Pati weaving of Sylhet		2017	01112	Shitalpati is a kind of mat which feels cold by nature. It is made from murta plants (Schumannianthus dichotomus).
Rickshaws and rickshaw painting in Dhaka		2023	01589	The art in question consists of oil paintings on the rear of the canvas roof of rickshaws, done by local street artists.
Traditional Saree weaving art of Tangail		2025	02322	Traditional Saree handweaving art in Tangail.

== See also ==
- List of World Heritage Sites in Bangladesh
- List of national monuments of Bangladesh
