= Sixty Dome Mosque =

Mosque in Bagerhat, Bangladesh

- ষাট গম্বুজ মসজিদ
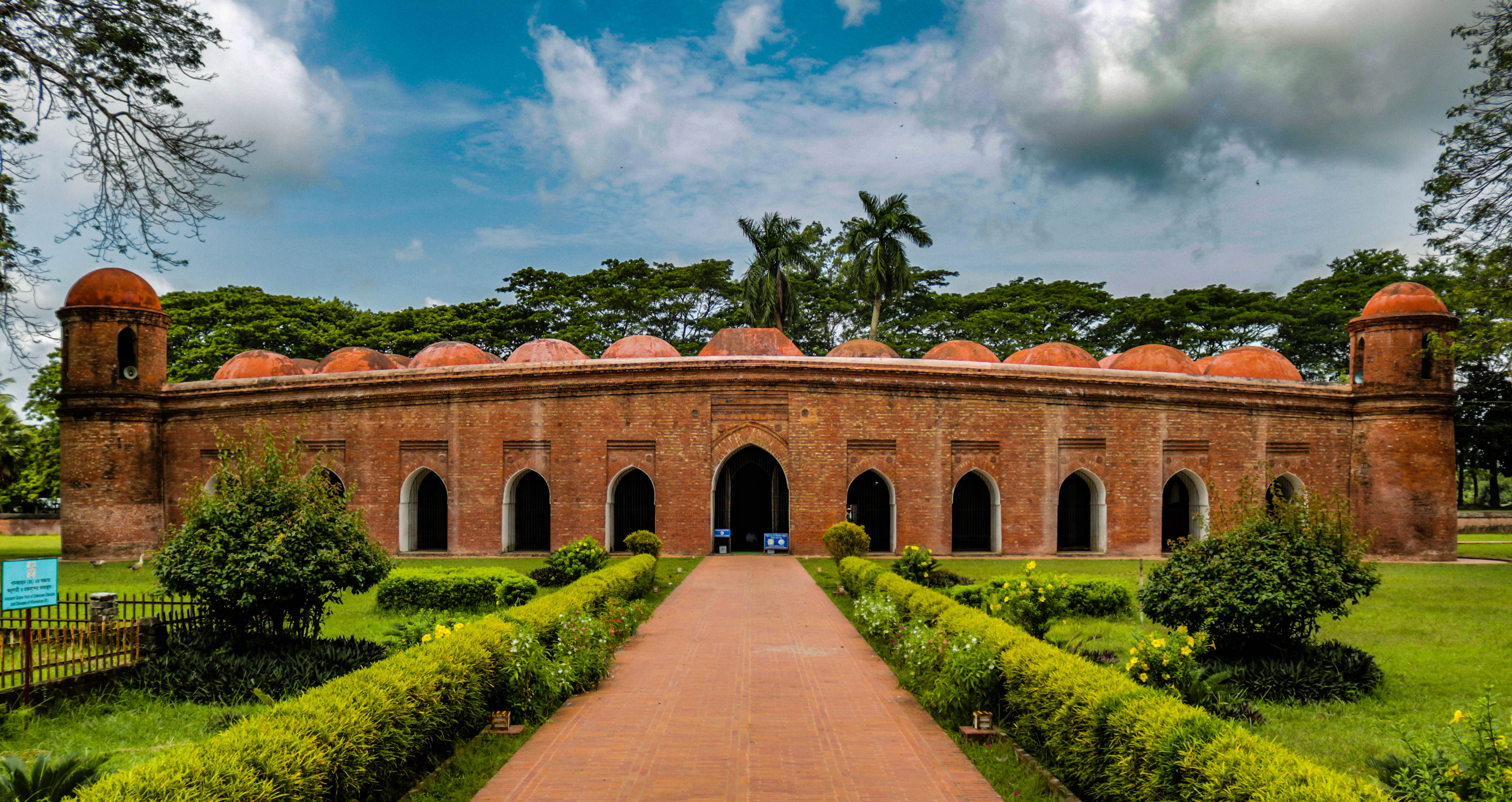
- The mosque in 2017

- Location of the mosques in Bangladesh

Religion
- Affiliation: Islam
- Ecclesiastical or organisational status: Mosque
- Status: Active

Location
- Location: Bagerhat, Khulna Division
- Country: Bangladesh
- Coordinates: 22°40′28″N 89°44′31″E

Architecture
- Architect: Khan Jahan Ali
- Type: Mosque architecture
- Style: Tughlaq; Bengal Sultanate
- Founder: Khan Jahan Ali
- Groundbreaking: 1442 CE
- Completed: 1459 CE

Specifications
- Length: 45.26 m (148 ft 6 in)
- Width: 30.89 m (101 ft 4 in)
- Interior area: 1,605 m^{2} (17,280 sq ft)
- Dome: 81
- Minaret: Four

UNESCO World Heritage Site
- Official name: Mosque City of Bagerhat
- Type: Cultural
- Criteria: iv
- Designated: 1985 (9th session)
- Reference no.: 321
- Region: Asia-Pacific

The Sixty Dome Mosque (Bengali: ষাট গম্বুজ মসজিদ) is a historical mosque, located in Bagerhat, in the Khulna Division of Bangladesh. It is a part of the Mosque City of Bagerhat, a UNESCO World Heritage Site. It is the largest mosque in Bangladesh from the Bengal Sultanate period (1352–1576). It was built by Khan Jahan Ali, the governor of the Sundarbans. It has been described as "one of the most impressive Muslim monuments in the whole of South Asia." It is situated approximately 4.8 kilometres (3 mi) from the main town of Bagerhat. Despite its nomenclature, the mosque has 81 domes that are supported by sixty columns.

== History ==
In the middle of the 15th century, a Muslim colony was founded in the mangrove forest of the Sundarbans, near the coast in the Bagerhat District by a saint-General, named Khan Jahan Ali. He preached in an affluent city during the reign of Sultan Nasiruddin Mahmud Shah, then known as 'Khalifatabad'. Khan Jahan adorned this city with more than a dozen mosques, the ruins of which are focused around the most imposing and largest multi-domed mosques in Bangladesh, known as the Shait-Gumbuz Masjid 49 by 33 metres (160 by 108 ft). The construction of the mosque began in 1442 and was completed in 1459. The mosque was used for prayers as well as served as a madrasha and assembly hall.

== Architecture ==
The Sixty Dome Mosque features unusually thick, tapered brick walls in the Tughlaq style and a hut-shaped roofline that anticipates later styles. Its oblong plan measures 45.26 metres (148 ft 6 in) by 30.89 metres (101 ft 4 in) externally, and 37.57 metres (123 ft 3 in) by 23.22 metres (76 ft 2 in) internally. There are 77 low domes arranged in seven rows of eleven, with an additional dome on each corner, bringing the total to 81 domes. There are four towers, two of four towers were used for the call to prayer (azaan). The interior is divided into many aisles and bays by slender columns, which culminate in numerous arches that support the roof.

The mosque has 77 squat domes with seven four-sided pitched Bengali domes in the middle row. The vast prayer hall, although provided with 11 arched doorways on east and seven each on north and south for ventilation and light, presents a dark and somber appearance inside. It is divided into seven longitudinal aisles and 11 deep bays by a forest of 60 slender stone columns, from which springs rows of endless arches, supporting the domes, each 1.8 metres (6 ft) thick, slightly tapering walls and hollow and round, almost detached corner towers, resembling the bastions of fortress, each capped by small rounded cupolas, recall the Tughlaq architecture of Delhi. The western wall features eleven mihrabs on the interior where ten are blind and the central one is projected on the exterior. The mosque represents wonderful archeological beauty which was the signature in the 15th century.

== Sixty domes or sixty columns ==
The mosque is locally known in Bengali as the 'Shat Gombuj Masjid', which means "Sixty Domed Mosque". However, there are 77 domes over the main hall and exactly 60 stone pillars.

== Gallery ==
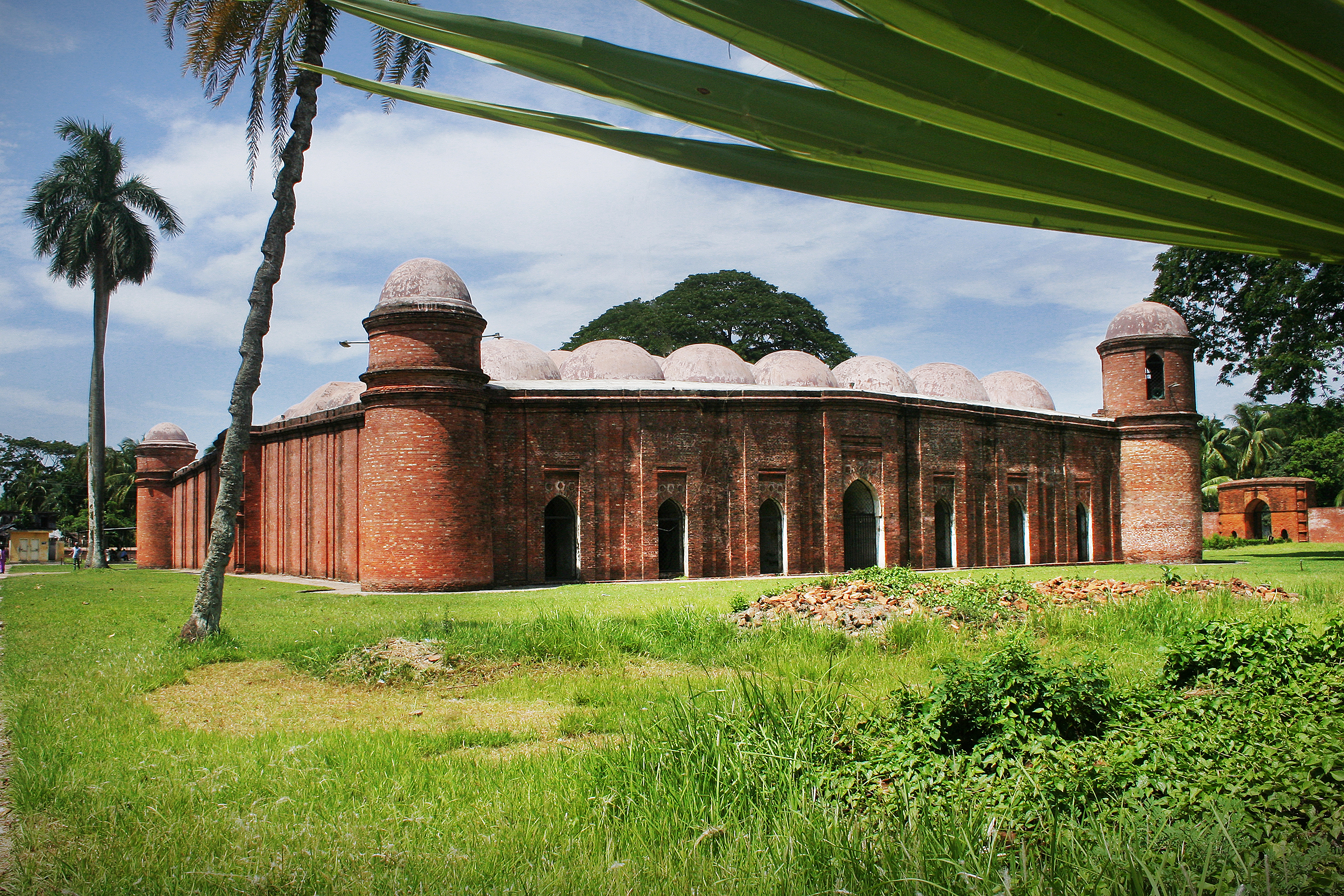
Side view of the mosque in 2007

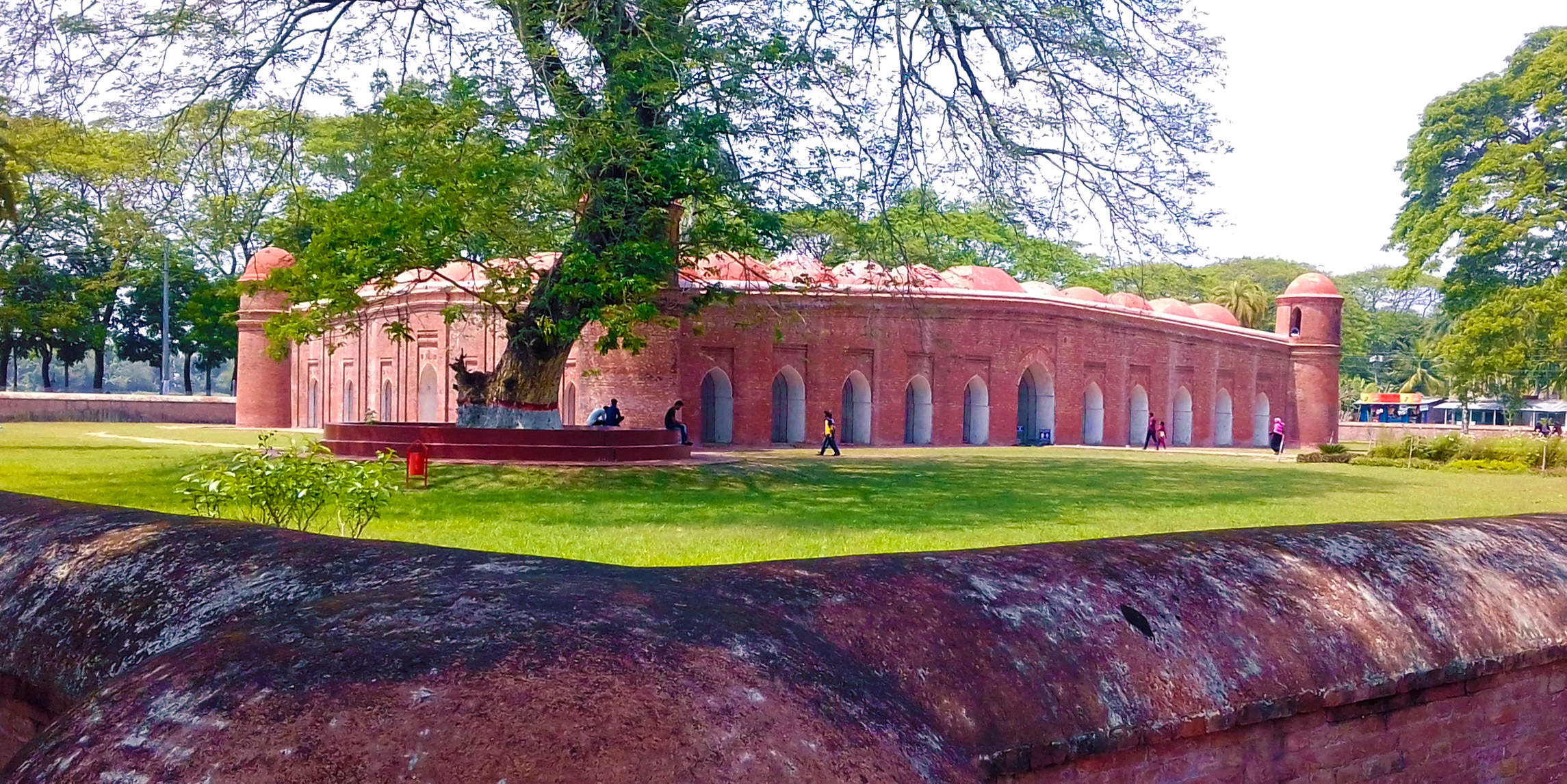
Southeastern view

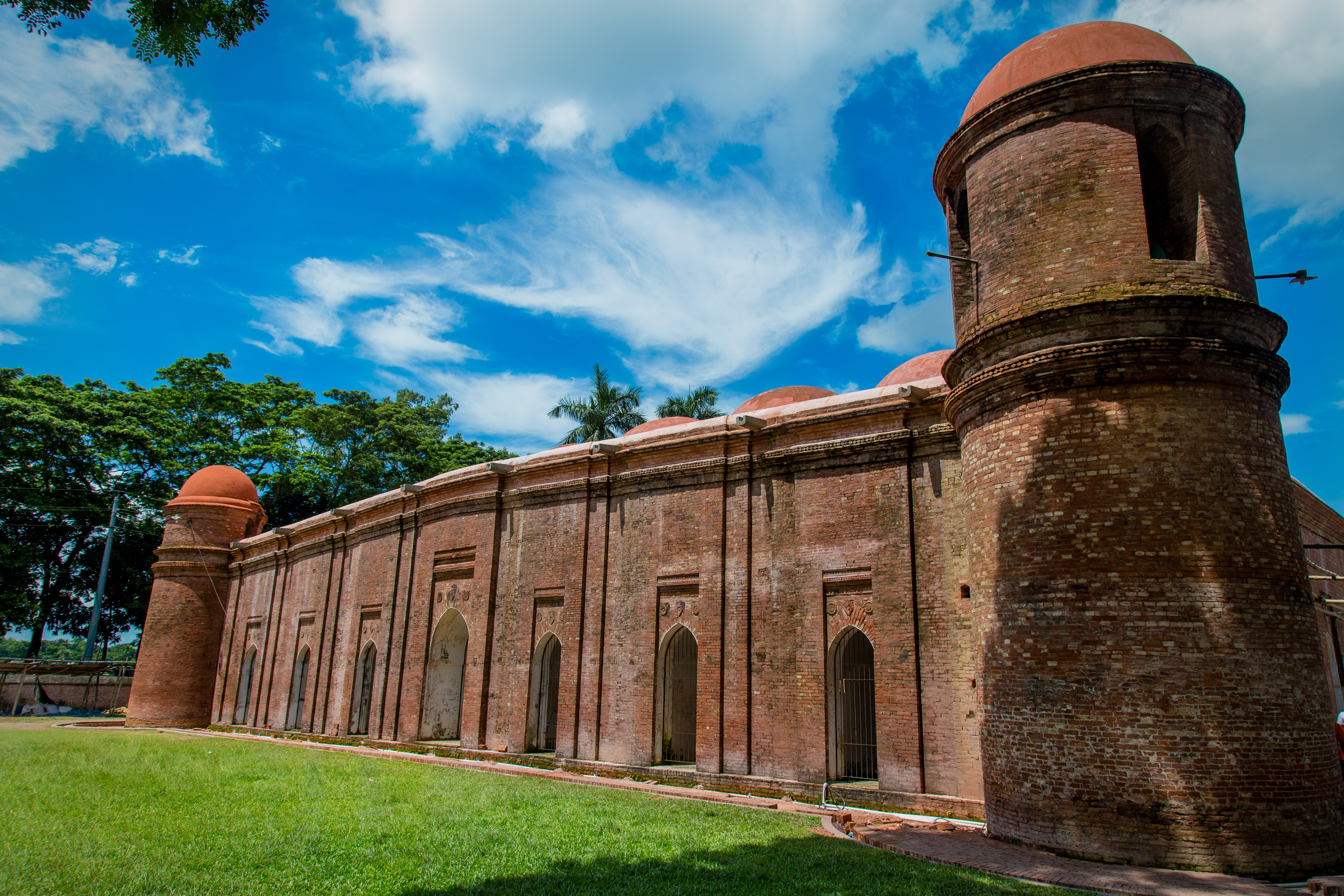
Side view

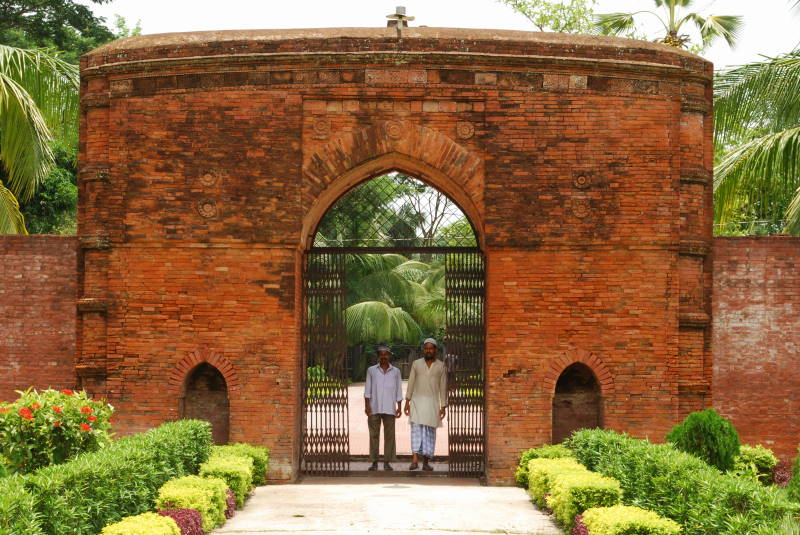
Main entrance of the mosque

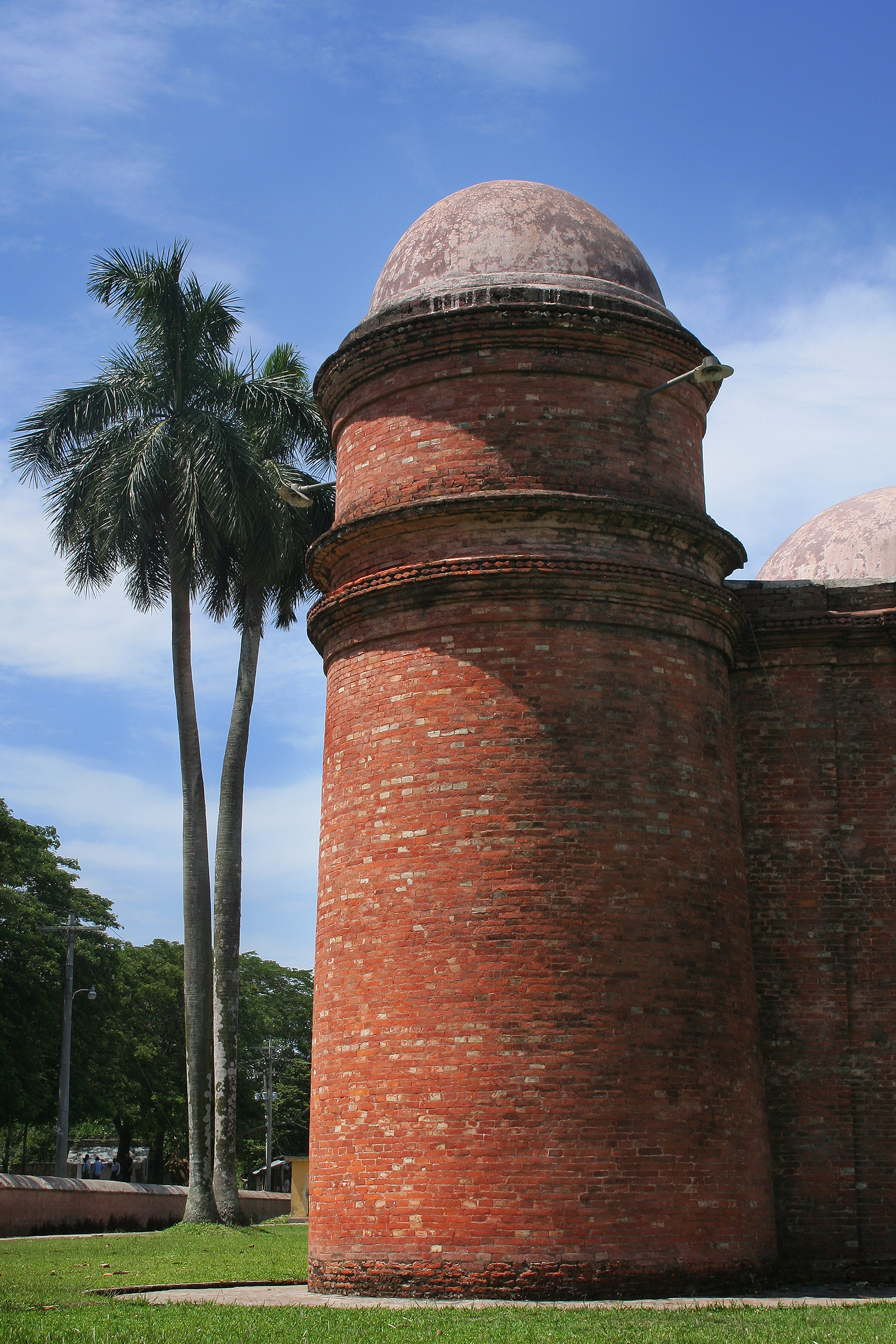
Main cornered pillars

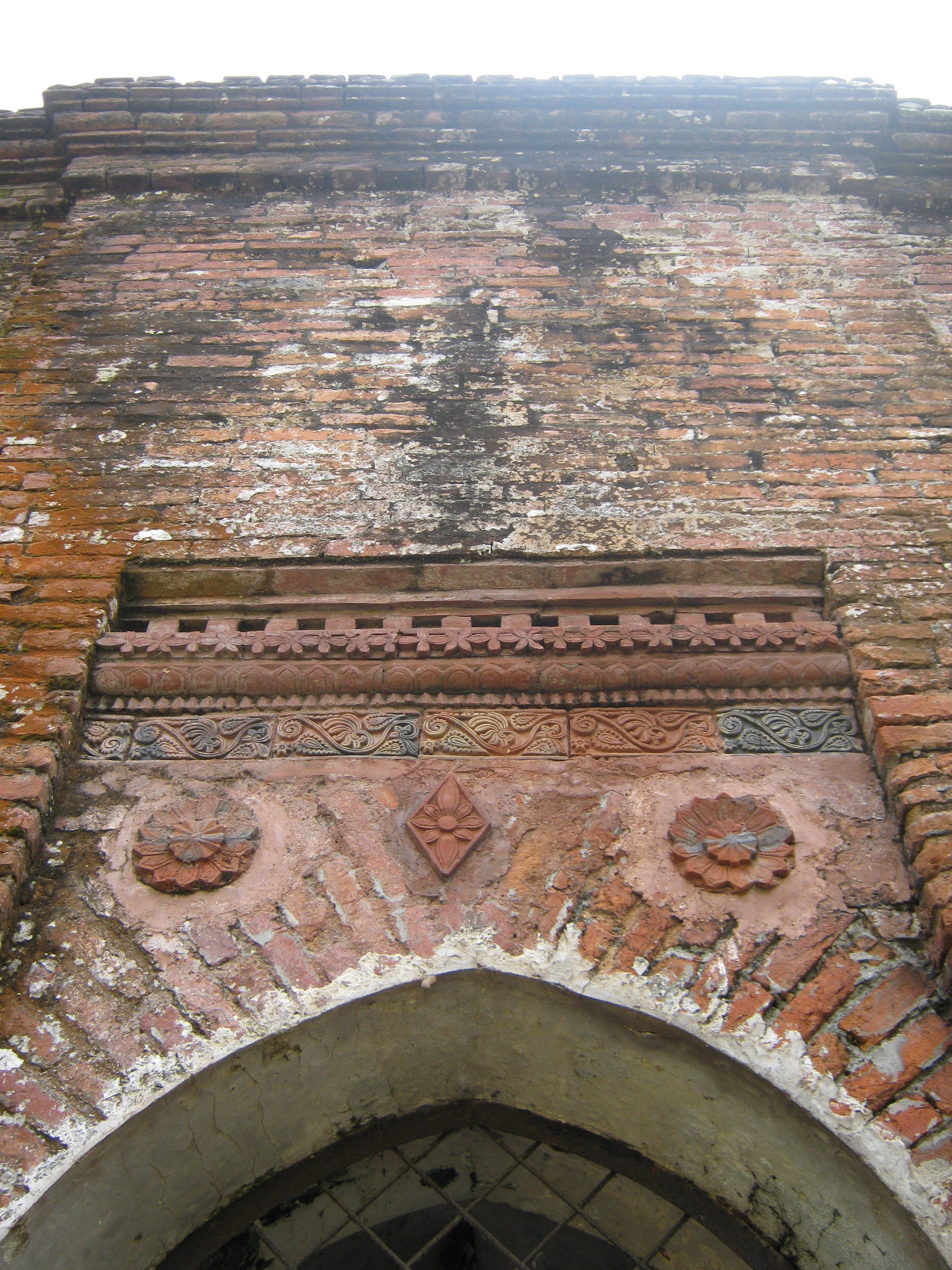
Exterior of the mosque

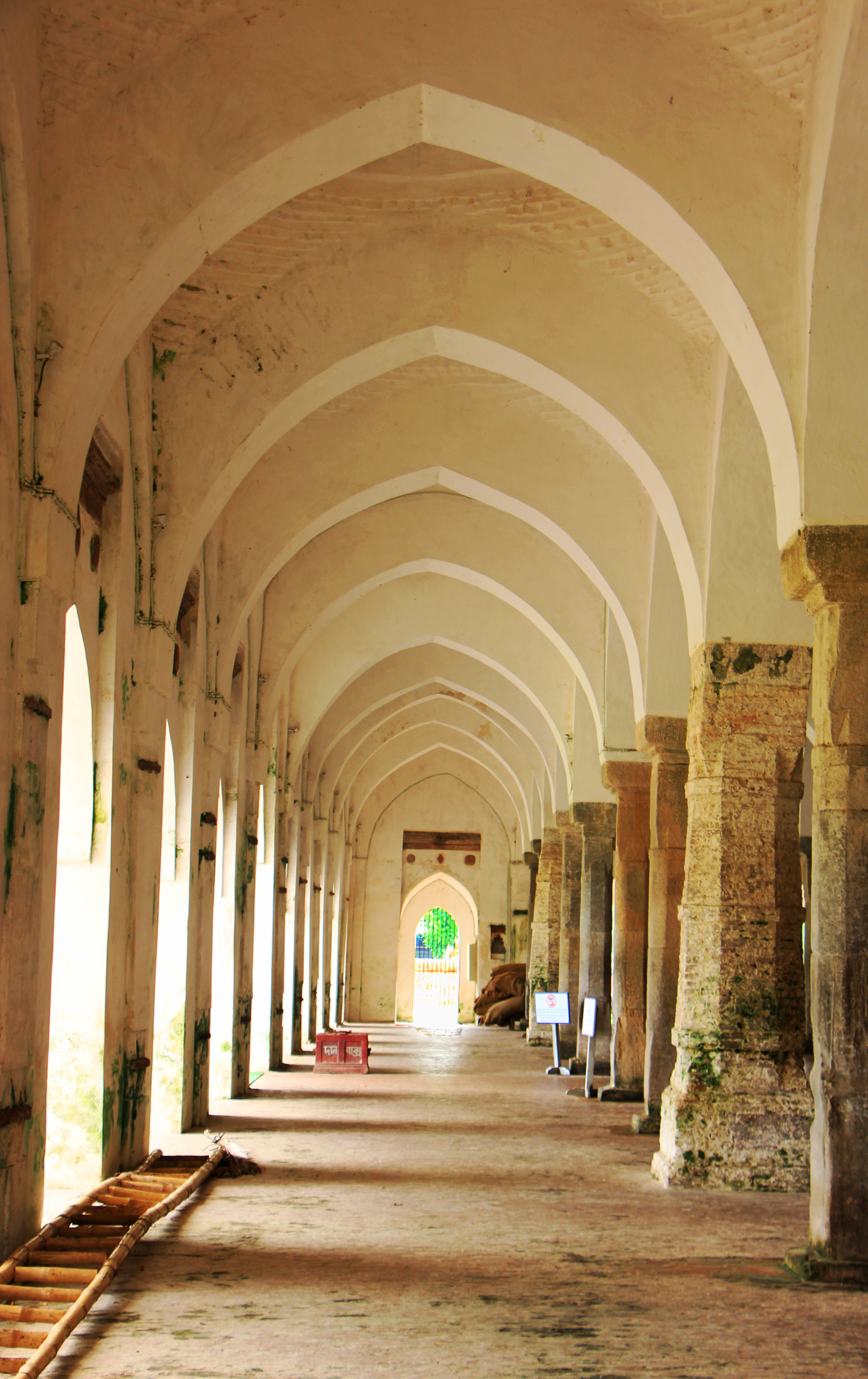
Inside of mosque

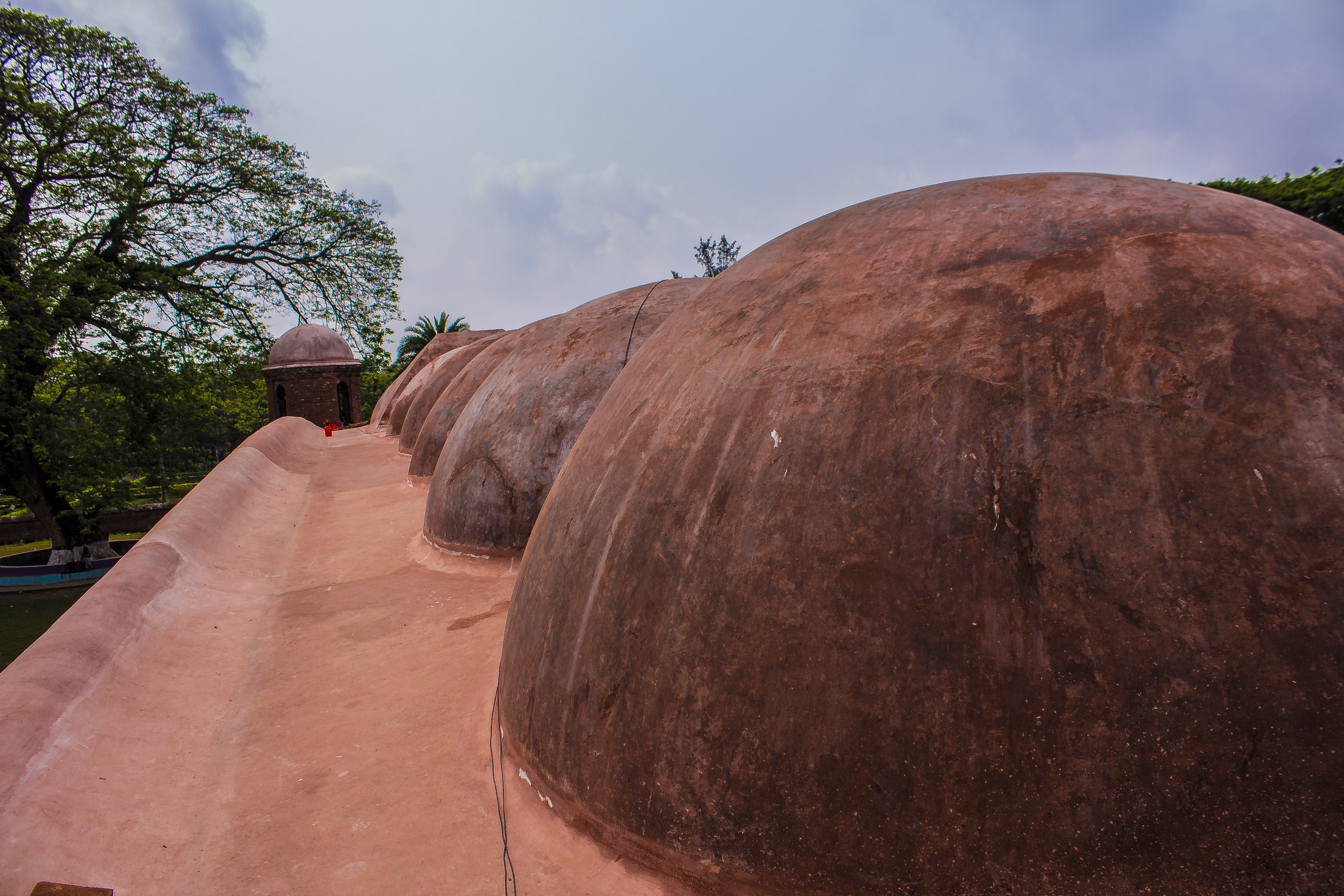
Dome exterior of the mosque

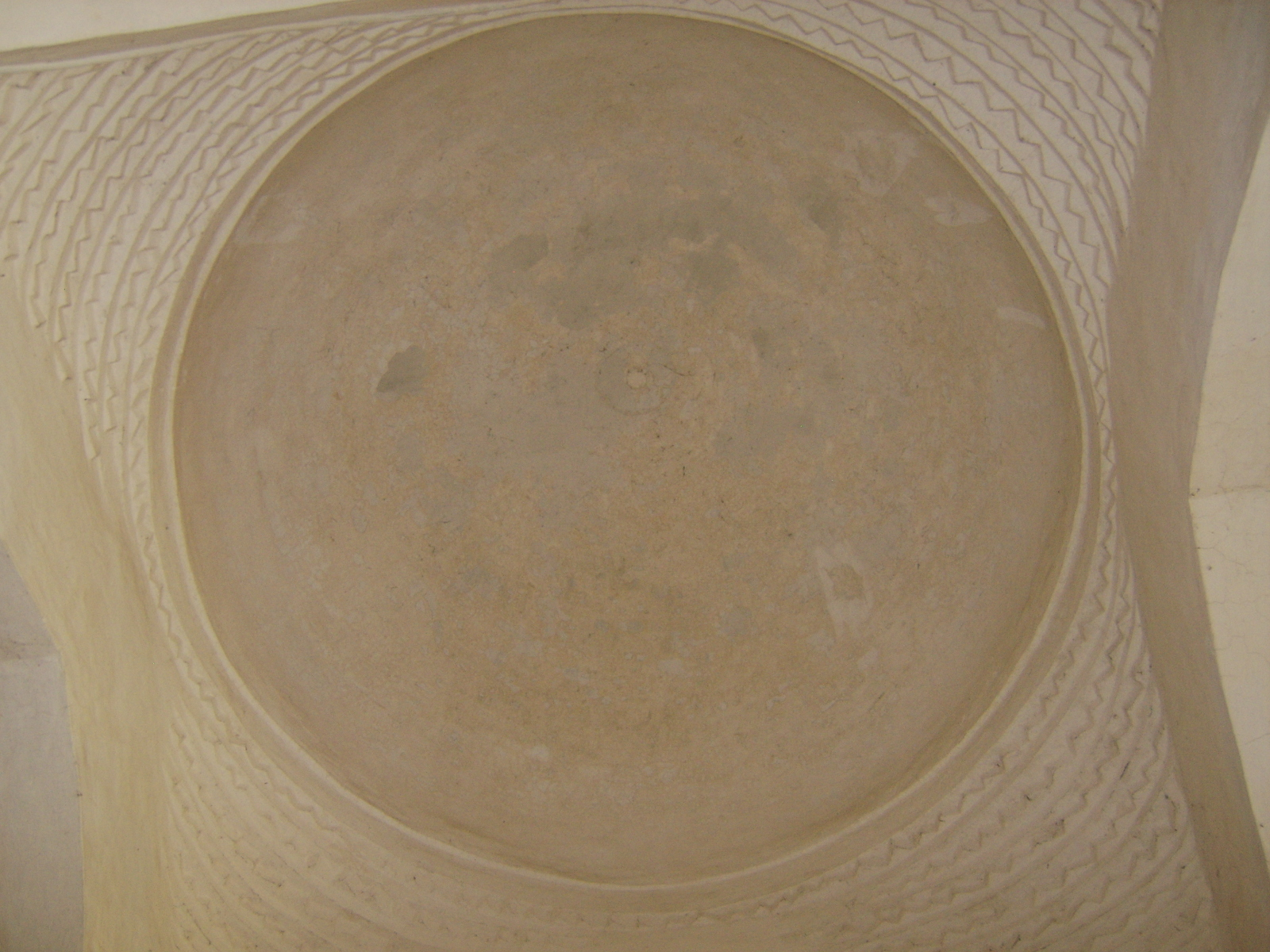
Dome interior of the mosque

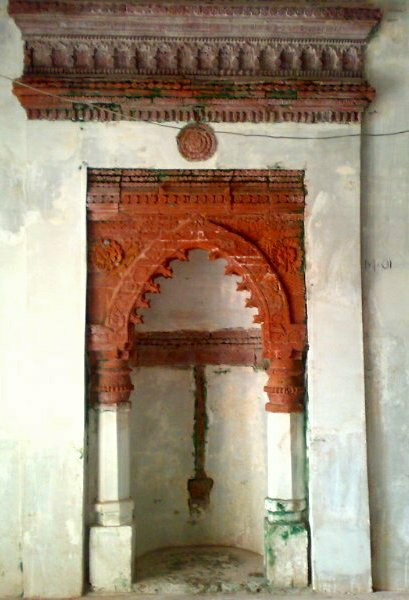
Mosque arches

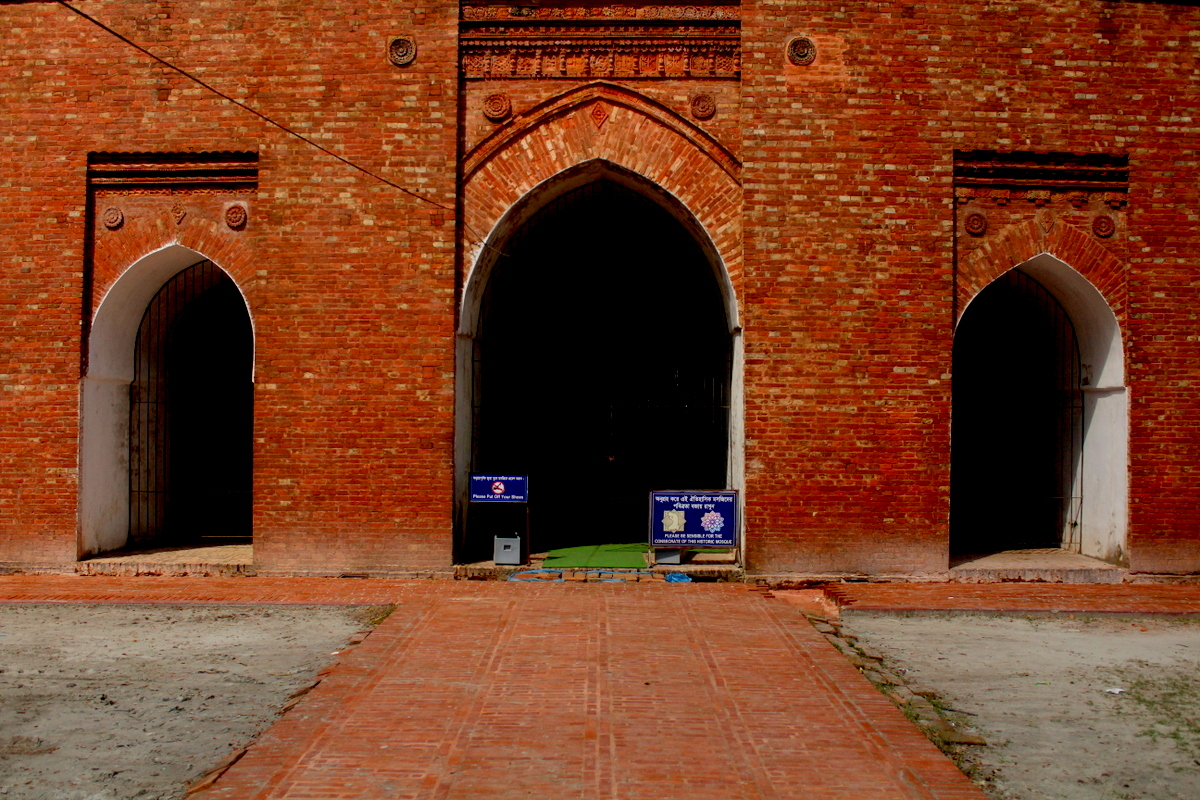
Mosque arches, exterior

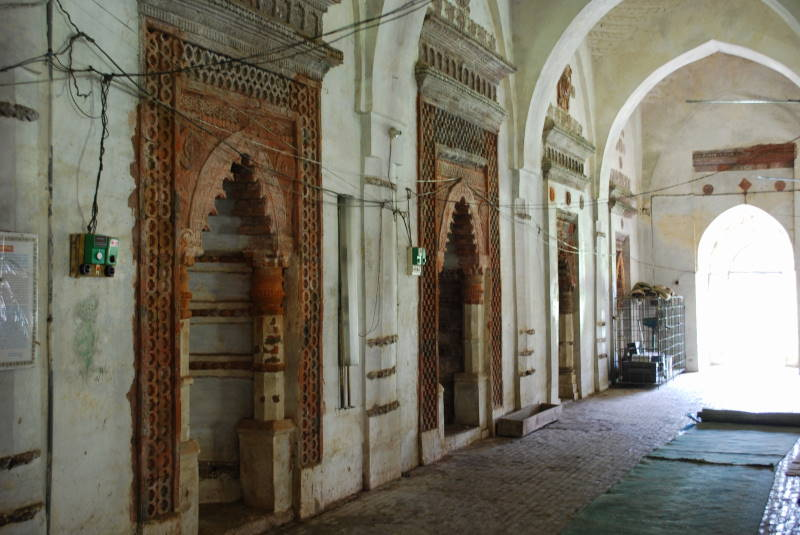
Mihrabs of the mosque

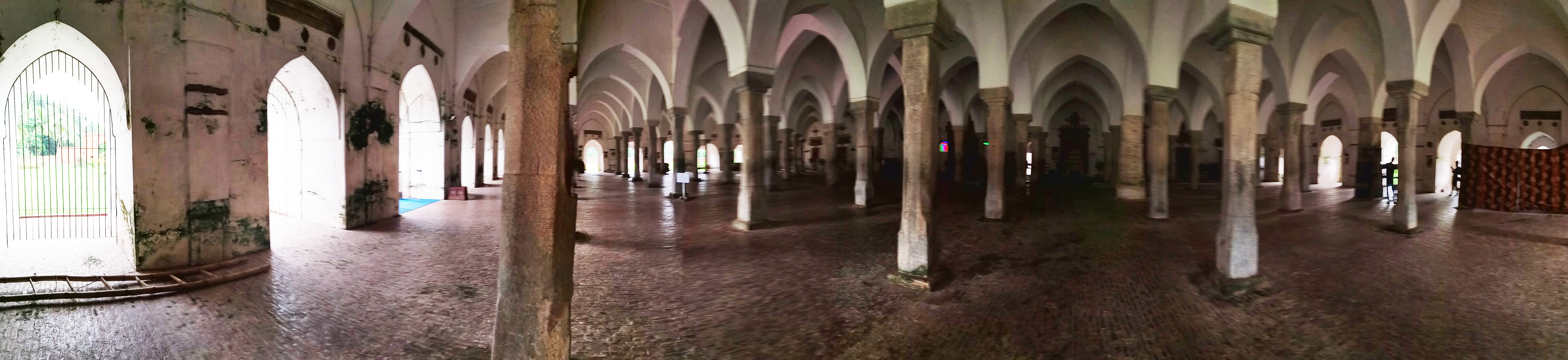
Inside pillars

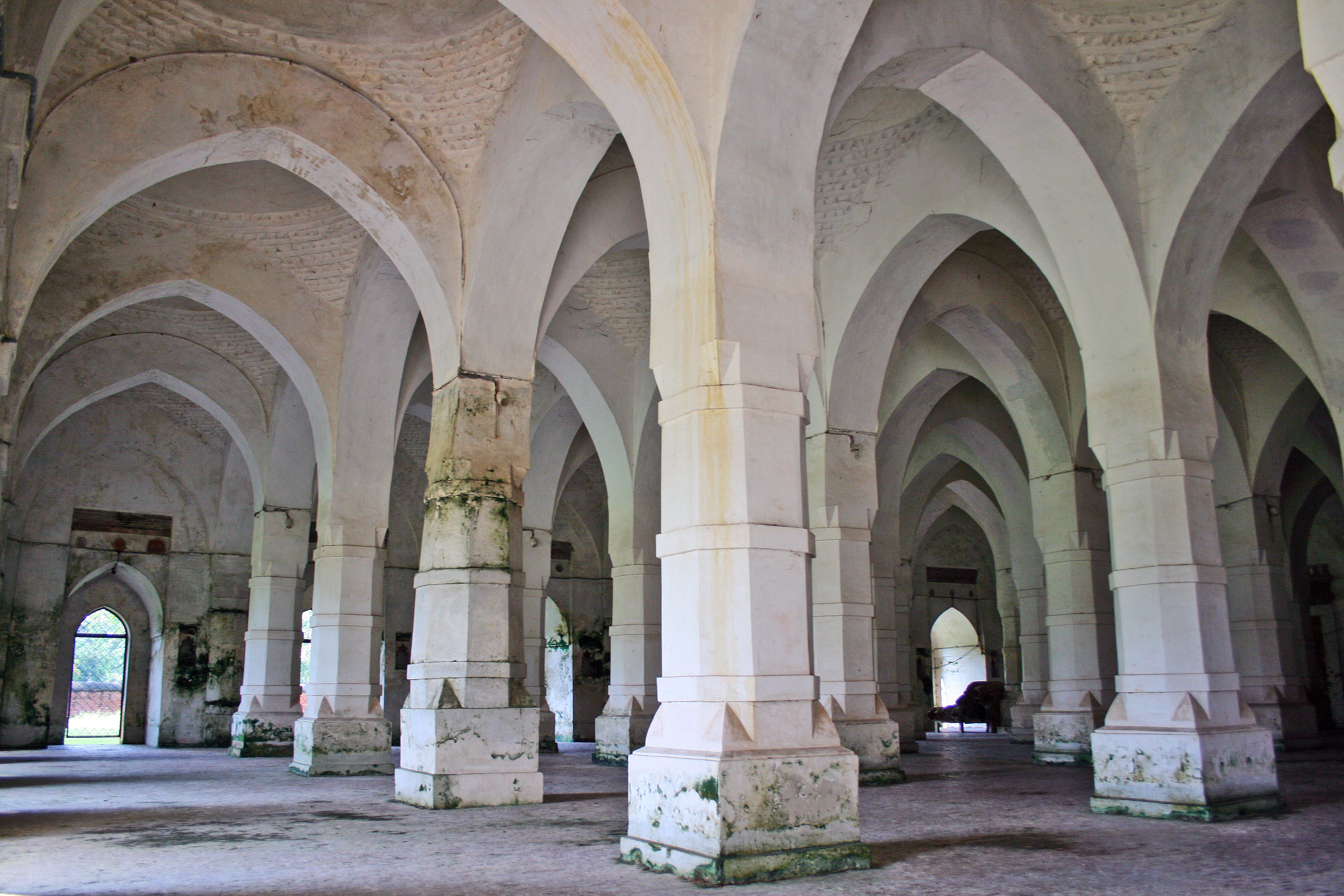
Interior view in 2007

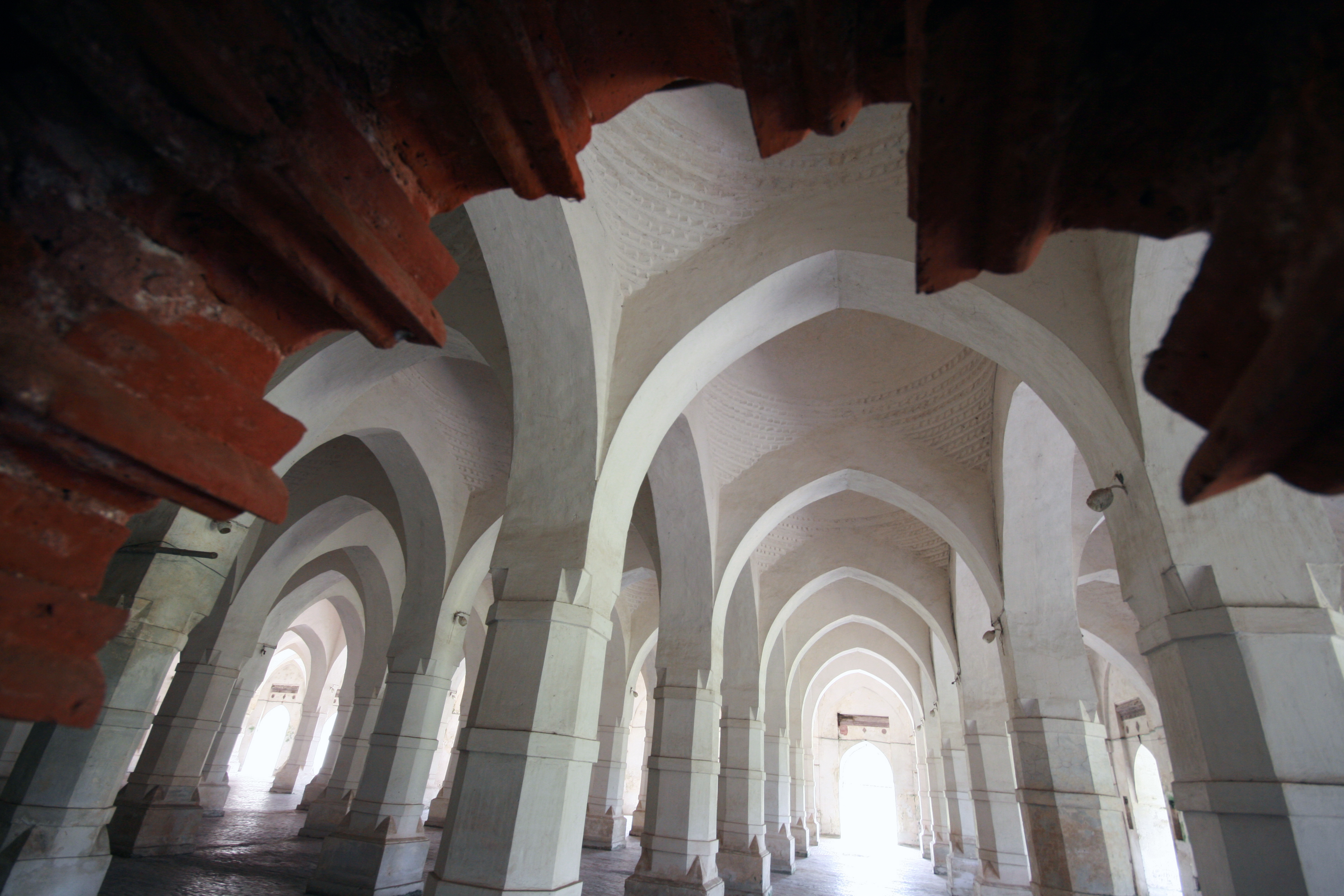
Interior ceiling

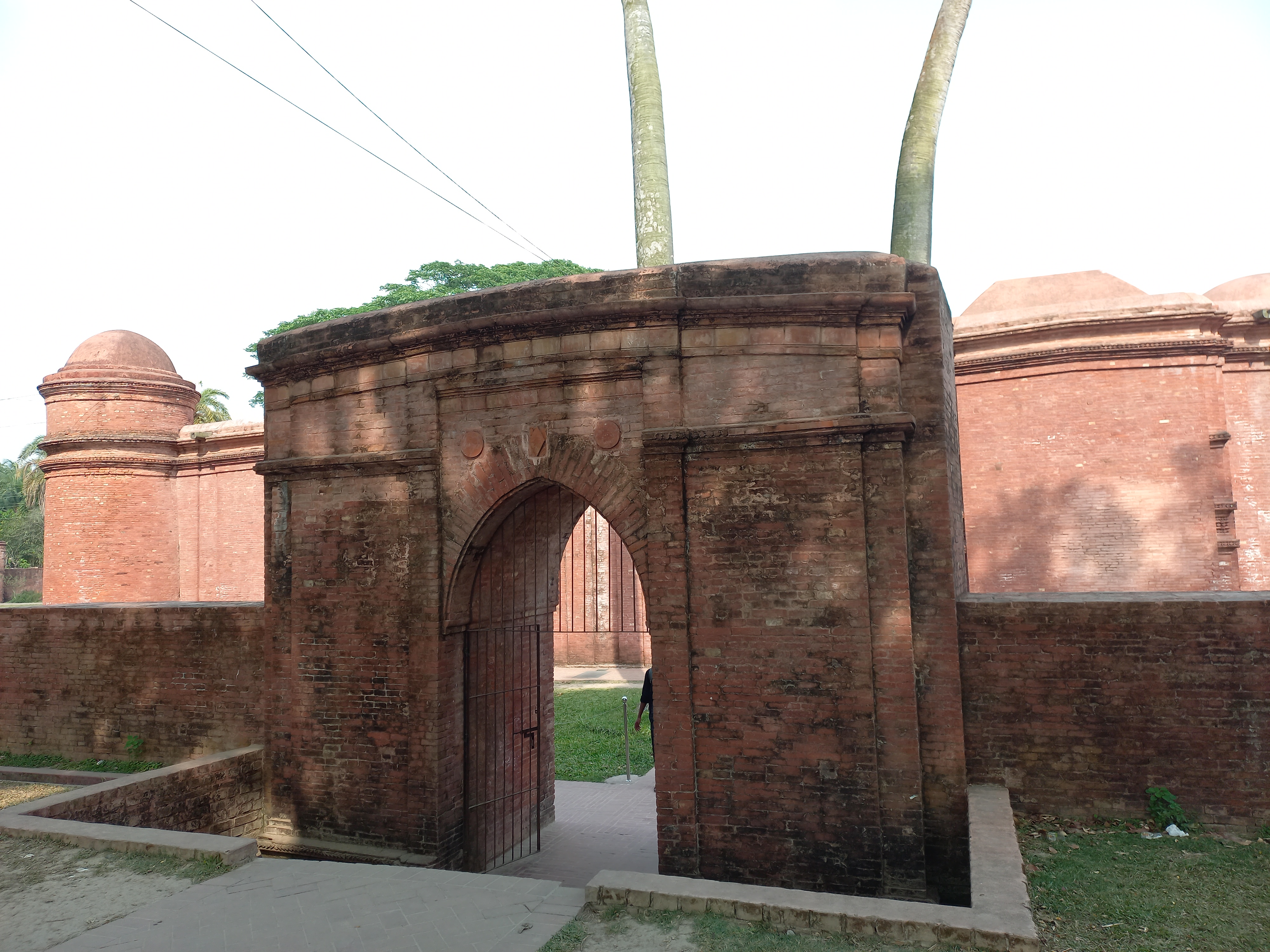
Back entrance of the mosque

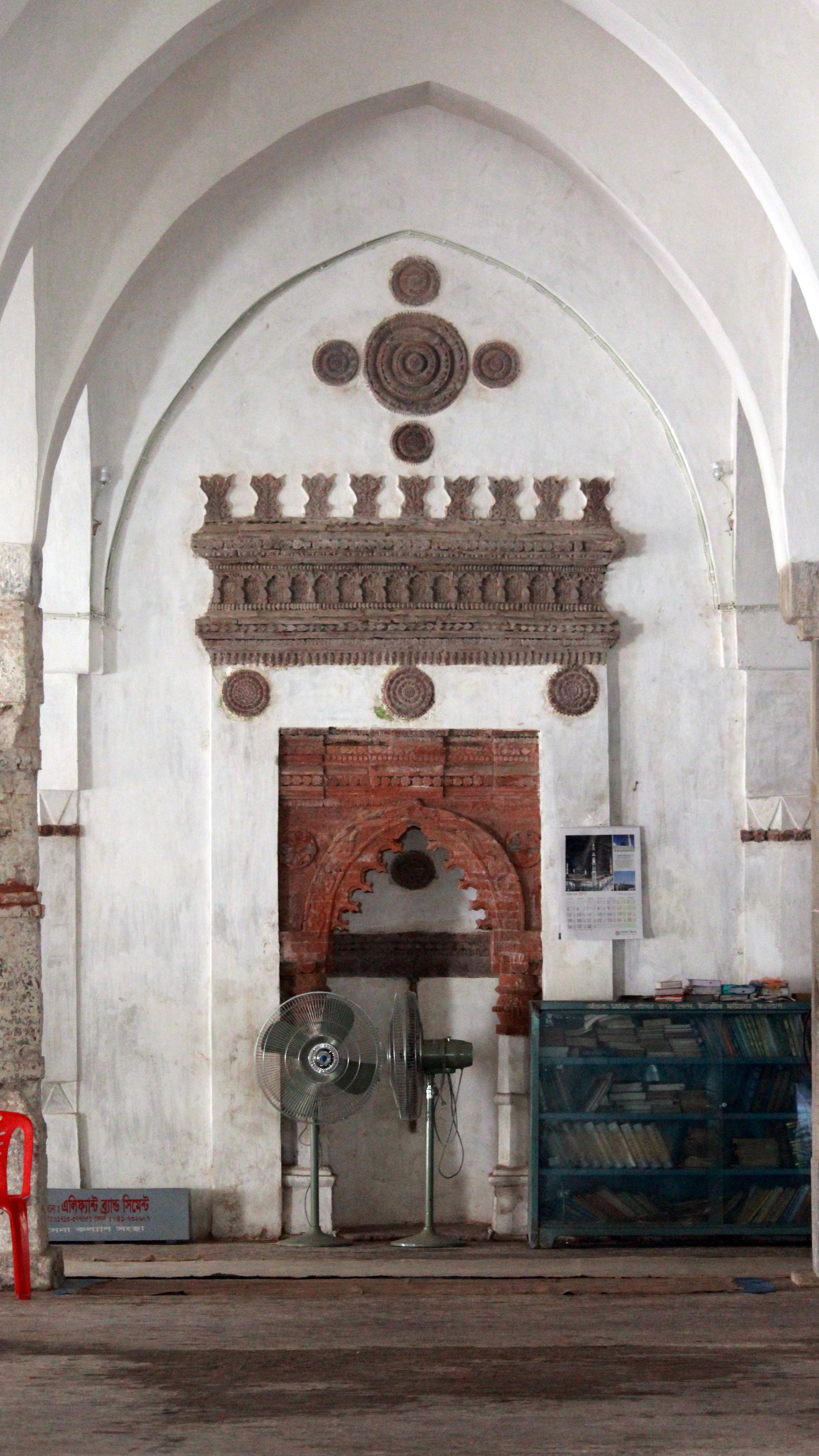
Mihrab arch of the mosque

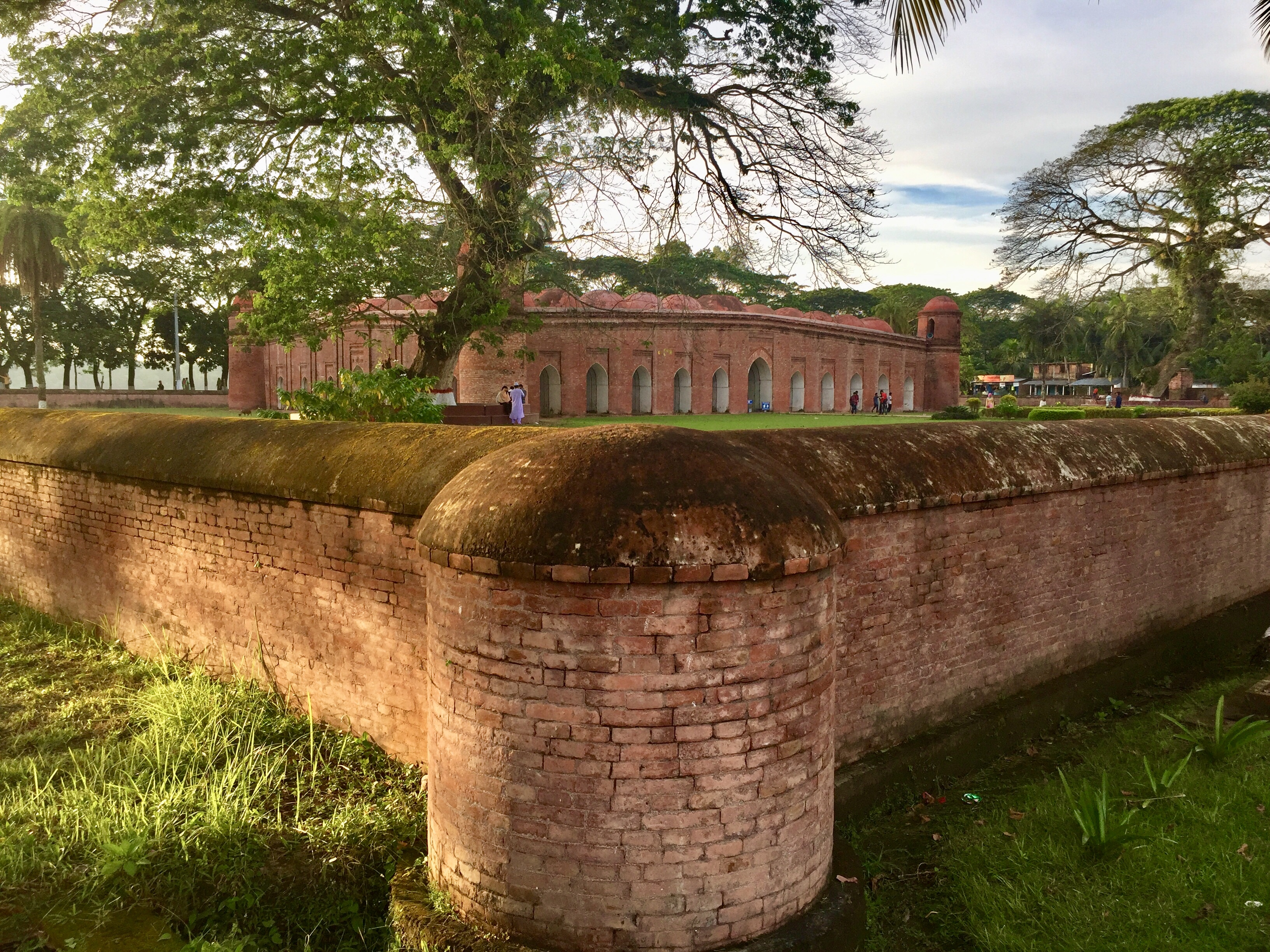
Outer wall of the mosque

== See also ==
- Islam in Bangladesh
- List of mosques in Bangladesh
- List of archaeological sites in Bangladesh
- List of World Heritage Sites in Bangladesh
