= List of World Heritage Sites in Bangladesh =

Location of World Heritage Sites in Bangladesh. Red dots are cultural sites, the green dot is a natural site.

The United Nations Educational, Scientific and Cultural Organization (UNESCO) World Heritage Sites are places of importance to cultural or natural heritage as described in the UNESCO World Heritage Convention, established in 1972. Cultural heritage consists of monuments (such as architectural works, monumental sculptures, or inscriptions), groups of buildings, and sites (including archaeological sites). Natural heritage consists of natural features (physical and biological formations), geological and physiographical formations (including habitats of threatened species of animals and plants), and natural sites which are important from the point of view of science, conservation, or natural beauty. Bangladesh accepted the convention on 3 August 1983, making its historical sites eligible for inclusion on the list.

There are three World Heritage Sites in Bangladesh, and a further seven on the tentative list. The first two sites listed were the Mosque City of Bagerhat and the Ruins of the Buddhist Vihara at Paharpur, in 1985. Both sites are cultural. The most recent site, the Sundarbans, was listed in 1997 and is a natural site.

== World Heritage Sites ==
UNESCO lists sites under ten criteria; each entry must meet at least one of the criteria. Criteria i through vi are cultural, and vii through x are natural.

World Heritage Sites
Site	Image	Location (division)	Year listed	UNESCO data	Description
Historic Mosque City of Bagerhat	Building of red bricks with a roof consisting of many white domes. There are small round towers on the corners of the building each crowned by a white cupola.	Khulna	1985	321: iv (cultural)	The city of Bagerhat was founded in the 15th century by Khan Jahan Ali under the name Khalifatabad. It contains over 300 mosques, public buildings, mausoleums, bridges, and water tanks, mostly constructed from baked brick. The city represents some of the most significant examples of early Muslim architecture in Bengal, including the Tomb of Khan Jahan and the Sixty Dome Mosque (pictured). The architectural style is unique to the site. After the death of the founder, the city got covered by the jungle.
Ruins of the Buddhist Vihara at Paharpur	Ruins of a structure of red stone now resembling a small hill or mound.	Rajshahi	1985	322; i, ii, vi (cultural)	Somapura Mahavihara, a Buddhist vihāra, or monastery, dates to the 8th century. It was an important centre of Mahayana Buddhism in the region until the 12th century, and is the second largest Buddhist monastery south of the Himalayas. It was decorated with stone and terracotta sculptures and carvings. It influenced the construction of temples in Myanmar, Java, and Cambodia.
The Sundarbans	Boat on a river in a densely forested plain.	Khulna	1997	798; ix, x (natural)	The national park covers the Bangladeshi part of the Sundarbans, the delta of the Ganges and Brahmaputra rivers. It is the world's largest and richest mangrove forest, with about 78 recorded mangrove species. It is a biodiversity hotspot, home to a large population of Bengal tigers, as well as an important habitat for the Irrawaddy dolphin and Ganges river dolphin, several species of birds and sea turtles. Three sanctuaries are listed. In India, the Sundarbans National Park is listed as a separate World Heritage Site.

== Tentative list ==
In addition to sites inscribed on the World Heritage List, member states can maintain a list of tentative sites that they may consider for nomination. Nominations for the World Heritage List are only accepted if the site was previously listed on the tentative list. Bangladesh lists seven properties on its tentative list.

Tentative sites
Site	Image	Location (division)	Year listed	UNESCO criteria	Description
Halud Vihara	Brick ruins in a square shape	Rajshahi	1999	ii, iii, iv, vi (cultural)	This is a proposed extension to the already listed World Heritage Site Ruins of the Buddhist Vihara at Paharpur. The remains of a Buddhist vihāra consist of a large mound and surrounding sites. Archaeological excavations have produced stone, metal, and terracotta works of art.
Jaggadala Vihara	Brick ruins, partially covered by grass	Rajshahi	1999	ii, iii, iv, vi (cultural)	This is a proposed extension to the already listed World Heritage Site Ruins of the Buddhist Vihara at Paharpur. The remains of a Buddhist vihāra consist of a large mound and surrounding sites. Archaeological excavations have unearthed stone sculptures of deities and terracotta plaques.
Lalbagh Fort	A Mughal-style fort in red stone and a pond in front	Dhaka	1999	i, ii, iv (cultural)	Construction of the fort started in 1678 under Muhammad Azam Shah. It was later occupied by Shaista Khan. The complex also includes a mosque, a hammam, and the tomb of Pari Bibi, daughter of Shaista Khan.
Mahansthangarh and its Environs	Ancient wall ruins covered by vegetation	Rajshahi	1999	ii, iii (cultural)	The archaeological site covers the remains of the ancient city of Pundranagar, founded in the 3rd century BCE. The city was located on the banks of the Karatoya River and was protected by moats and walls.
The Lalmai-Mainamati Group of monuments	Tourists looking at the ancient wall ruins	Chittagong	1999	ii, iii, iv, vi (cultural)	The site comprises the remains of about 50 Buddhist settlements in the Comilla District. They were likely a local centre from which Buddhism was spreading to South East Asia.
The Architectural Works of Muzharul Islam: an Outstanding Contribution to the Modern Movement in South Asia	Interior of a modernist building with columns and a staircase	several sites	2023	ii (cultural)	This nomination comprises 12 buildings or complexes of buildings designed by the Bangladeshi architect Muzharul Islam. He was influential in developing modern architecture in tropical setting. One of the features of his style is blurring the boundary between interior and exterior of the buildings. Buildings included in the nomination are university buildings, large scale housing, public buildings, and residences, and were built from the 1950s to 1990s. Art Institute in Dhaka is pictured.
Mughal Forts on Fluvial Terrains in Dhaka	Remains of a fortress wall	Dhaka	2023	ii, iv (cultural)	This nomination comprises four forts in Dhaka and surroundings: Hajiganj Fort (pictured), Sonakanda Fort, Idrakpur Fort, and Lalbagh Fort. They were constructed in the 17th century under the Mughals to control the main rivers of Bengal. As the region is largely devoid of stone, the forts were constructed of brick and plaster, and parts are made of mud.

== See also ==
- List of Intangible Cultural Heritage elements in Bangladesh
- Tourism in Bangladesh
- List of archaeological sites in Bangladesh
- List of national monuments of Bangladesh
