= List of national monuments of Bangladesh =

The following is a list of monuments in Bangladesh that are recognized as having national significance. These monuments commemorate important historical events, cultural heritage, and prominent figures in the country's history. Several of them are protected archaeological sites or memorials established by the Government of Bangladesh.

== List ==
Name	Location	Description	Image
National Martyrs' Memorial	Savar Upazila, Greater Dhaka	A national monument built to honor the martyrs who died during the Bangladesh Liberation War of 1971.	
Shaheed Minar	New Dhaka, Dhaka	Memorial built to commemorate the martyrs of the Bengali Language Movement. The present structure was completed in 1963 and rebuilt after the independence of Bangladesh.	
Independence Monument	New Dhaka, Dhaka	National monument to commemorate the historical events that took place in the Suhrawardy Udyan regarding the Bangladesh Liberation War.	
Mujibnagar Memorial	Mujibnagar, Meherpur District	A memorial built at the place where the Provisional Government of Bangladesh was formed during the Liberation War.	

== See also ==
- List of World Heritage Sites in Bangladesh
- Tourism in Bangladesh
