= Khan Jahan =

Khan Jahan is a medieval titular name of Persian and Turkish origin.

== People ==
- Khan Jahan I, (16th century) Mughal Empire military commander and governor
- Khan Jahan Lodi, (17th century) Afghan noble who rebelled against the Mughal Empire
- Khan Jahan Ali, (15th century) Uzbek Muslim saint of Bengal
- Mandalika III, 15th-century Chudasama ruler of Saurashtra, Gujarat, India; known by the regnal name Khan Jahan

== Places ==
- Khan Jahan Ali Thana, division in Khulna, Bangladesh
- Khan Jahan Ali Bridge, bridge over the Rupsa River, Bangladesh
- Khan Jahan Ali Airport, airport in Bagerhat, Bangladesh
- Khan Jahan Ali's Tank, body of water by the Ulugh Khāni tomb, Bangladesh

== See also ==
- Jahan Khan (disambiguation)
