= Abubakar Siddique =

Bangladeshi writer (1934–2023)

- আবুবকর সিদ্দিক
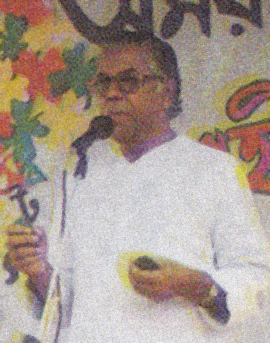
- Born: 19 August 1934; Bagerhat Sadar, Bengal Province, British India
- Died: 28 December 2023 (aged 89); Khulna, Bangladesh
- Education: University of Dhaka
- Occupations: Poet, writer
- Awards: Full list

Abubakar Siddique (19 August 1934 – 28 December 2023) was a Bangladeshi poet, novelist, short-story writer and critic. He published more than 20 poetry books, 4 novels, 15 storybooks, and one rhyme book. He won Bangla Academy Literary Award in 1988.

== Background ==
Siddique was born on 19 August 1934 at Gotapara in Bagerhat Sadar in the then British India. He passed SSC from Bagerhat Secondary Government High School in 1952 and HSC from Government P.C. College, Bagerhat in 1954. He later earned his Bachelor of Arts degree from the same college in 1956. He got his master's degree in Bengali from the University of Dhaka in 1958.

== Career ==
Siddique was a faculty member at Fazlul Haque College, Brajalal College, Kushtia College, Government P.C. College, Bagerhat, University of Rajshahi, Queens University and Notre Dame College. He retired on 7 July 1994.

== Personal life ==
Siddique was the father of Bidisha Ershad, wife of the 9th President of Bangladesh Hussain Muhammad Ershad. Siddique died on 28 December 2023 in Khulna.

== Works ==
=== Novels ===
- Jalarakshas (The Water Demon) (1985) OCLC 17117540
- Kharadaha (Flame of Drought) (1987) OCLC 423293860
- Barudpora Prohor (Gun-Powder Time) (1966)
- Ekatturer Hridobhasma (The Heart Ash of 1971) (1997) OCLC 37694758

== Awards ==
- Bangla Academy Literary Award (1988)
- Bangladesh Kathashilpi Sangsad Prize
- Bangabhasha Sanskriti Prasar Samity Award (Kolkata)
- Khulna Sahitya Parishad Award
- Bagerhat Foundation Award
- Rishij Medal
- Bangladesh Lekhika Sangha Gold Medal
