= Basabari =

Coordinates: 22°39′N 89°48′E

Basabari is an area of the town of Bagerhat in southwestern Bangladesh. It is located in Bagerhat Sadar Upazila of Bagerhat District, Khulna Division.
