= Jahan Khan =

Jahan Khan is a name in the Islamic World of Persian and Turkish origin.

Notable topics by the name include:

- Jahan Khan (Afghan general), Commander-in-Chief of the Durrani Empire
- Jahan Khan (popularly known as Mujeeb Chandio) is a cricketer from Larkana Region.
- Jahan Khan (town), union council of Shikarpur, Sindh
- Jahan Khanamlu, village of Ardabil province
- Jan Khani, village of Kohgiluyeh and Boyer-Ahmad province

== See also ==
- Khan Jahan
