= Bibi Begni Mosque =

Mosque in Sadar Upazila, Bagerhat, Bangladesh

- বিবি বেগনি মসজিদ
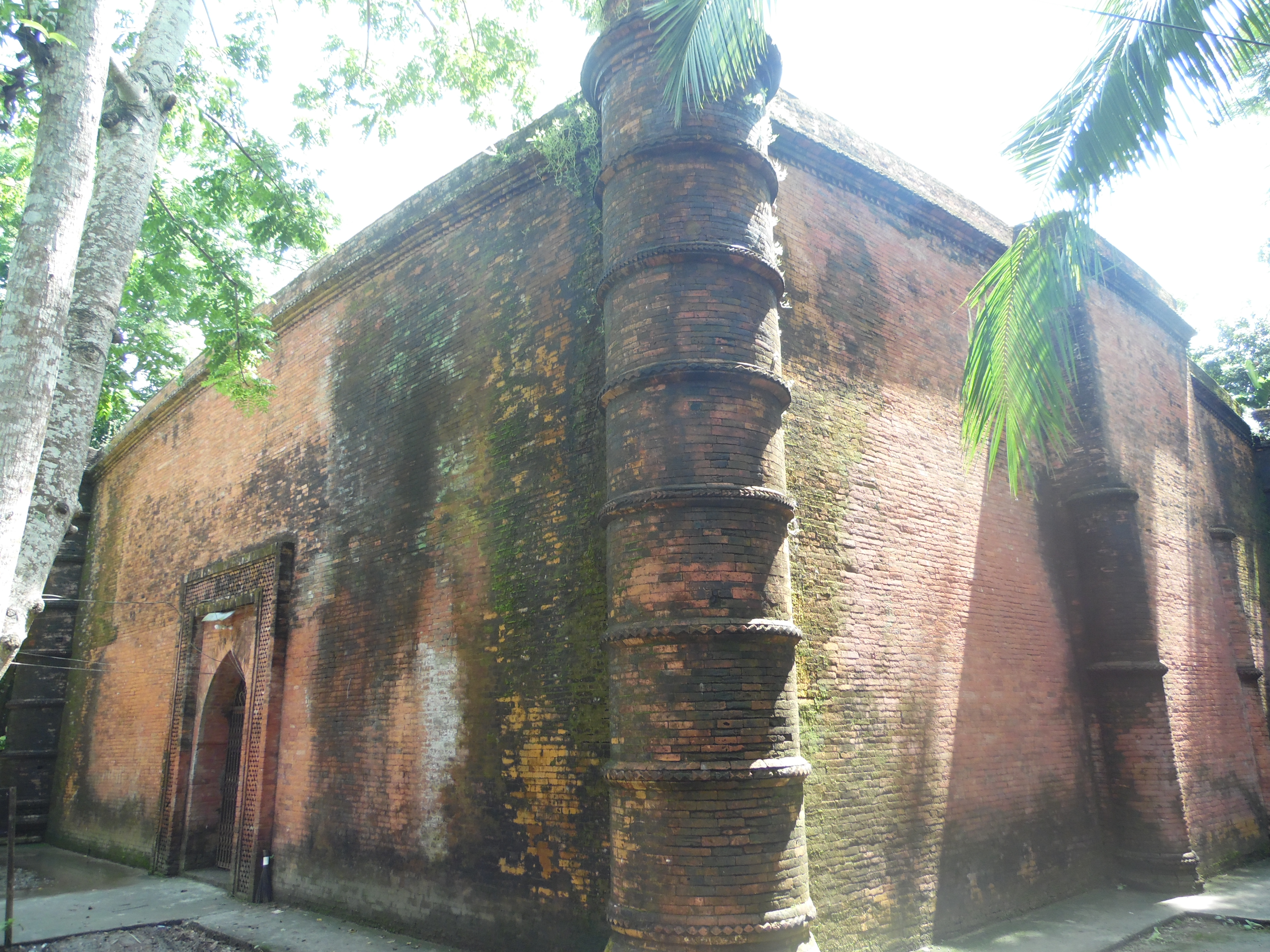

Religion
- Affiliation: Islam

Location
- Municipality: Bagerhat Sadar Upazila, Bagerhat
- State: Khulna
- Country: Bangladesh
- Interactive map of Bibi Begni Mosque
- Coordinates: 22°40′35″N 89°44′06″E

Architecture
- Type: mosque
- Style: Bengal Sultanate

Specifications
- Width: 1.20 m (3 ft 11 in)
- Interior area: 10.0 m (32.8 ft)
- Dome: 1
- Materials: brick

Bibi Begni Mosque is located in Sadar Upazila of Bagerhat District, Bangladesh. It is an archaeological site of Bangladesh.

== Location ==
Bibi Begni Masjid is located on the 200 meter west bank of Ghora Dighi, in Barakpur village of Chunakhola of Satgambuj Union of Bagerhat Sadar Upazila, about 800 meters west of Sixty Dome Mosque.

== Description ==
The mosque is attributed to Bibi Begni, who is locally believed to have been Khan Jahan Ali's wife. Chunakhola means “lime field”. The interior is 10 square meter the wall thickness is 3.10 meter. The mosque is a large square building with three entrances in the east, and one each on the north and south sides: the central one in the east and the north and south entrances are the same size (1.70 m wide); the two other eastern entrances are smaller (1.30 m wide). In the west wall opposite the eastern entrances are three semicircular mihrabs of which the central one is the largest. It has a depth and width of 1.20 meter; the corresponding measurement of the side mihrabs is 90 cm. On the outside are engaged circular towers at the four corners. The mesh of four petals appears on many of the Khan Jahan style monuments and is similar to brickwork patterns in Persian architecture, e.g., on the southwest main portal of the Masjid-i Jami at Isfahan (twelfth century) and the shrine of Bayazid at Bistam (1120). Between the base and the cornice the corner towers have six more rows of mouldings with lozenges, triangles, and tooth patterns.
