= Mausoleum of Khan Jahan Ali =

Tomb of Khan Jahan Ali

Khan Jahan Ali Mazar
- খান জাহান আলী (রঃ) মাজার
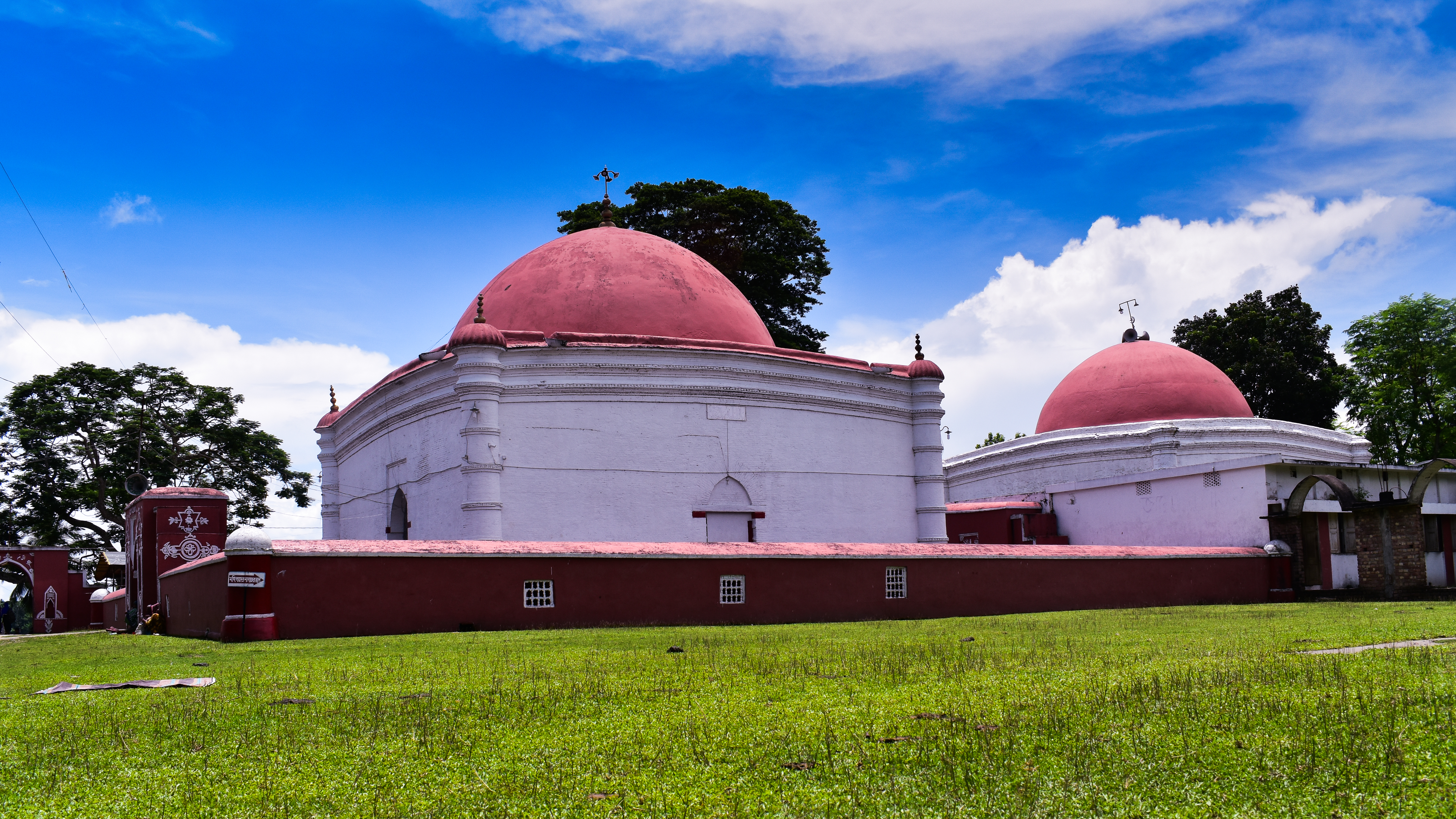
- The tomb (left) and the adjoining mosque (right)

- Location within Bangladesh

Religion
- Affiliation: Islam
- Status: Active

Location
- Location: Khan Jahan Ali Road, Bagerhat, Khulna
- Country: Bangladesh
- Interactive map of Khan Jahan Ali Mazar
- Administration: Department of Archeology
- Coordinates: 22.660973°N 89.758378°E

Architecture
- Type: Mosque architecture
- Style: Bengal Sultanate Tughlaq
- Founder: Khan Jahan Ali
- Established: 1459; 567 years ago
- Inscriptions: 2
- Materials: Brick, Stone

The Mausoleum of Khan Jahan Ali, commonly known as Khan Jahan Ali Mazar (Bengali: খান জাহান আলীর মাজার) is a historic tomb located in Bagerhat District, Khulna, Bangladesh. Built in 1459, it serves as the final resting place of Khan Jahan Ali, 15th-century Sufi saint and regional governor credited with spreading Islam in southern Bengal and founding the Mosque City of Bagerhat, a UNESCO World Heritage Site. The mausoleum, constructed in the distinctive Khan Jahan architectural style, features a square structure with a single dome, cut stone walls, and intricate designs. Adjacent to the mazar is a large pond, known as Thakur Dighi, and a mosque, forming part of a significant religious and cultural complex.

== Architecture ==
=== The Tomb of Khan Jahan Ali ===
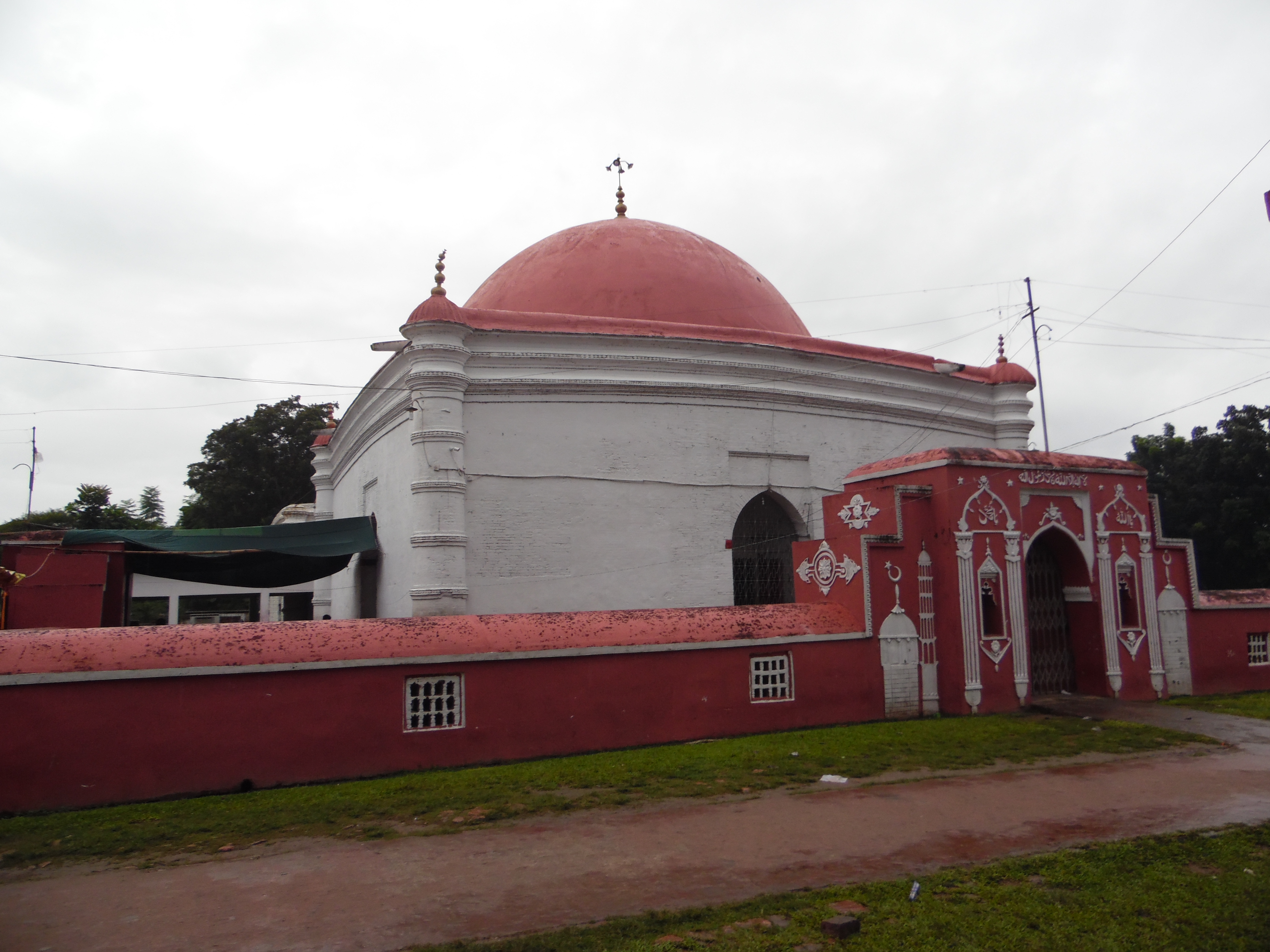
The mausoleum of Khan Jahan Ali

The tomb complex comprises a square tomb building for Khan Jahan and for his diwan (chief minister) Muhammad Tahir. Locals believe Tahir was his favourite officer. The Tomb is surrounded by an outer wall of 67.1 by 64.7 m (220 by 212 ft). The tomb complex, is a brick-built square structure measuring 13.7 m (45 ft) per side externally and 9.1 m (30 ft) internally.

The walls, with a thickness of 2.4 m (7.9 ft), are reinforced with stone casing up to a height of approximately 0.9 m (3.0 ft). An intermediary wall encloses the central tomb and the diwan’s sarcophagus, creating a distinct inner precinct within the complex. Inscription on the tombstone records the death of Khan Jahan on 27 Dhu al-Hijjah 863 AH (25 October 1459 AD). Khan Jahan had probably constructed the building before his death.

=== Khan Jahan Ali Mosque ===
The mosque, a notable example of Khan Jahan-style architecture, is a square structure with a recently repaired and extended design. Locals have added a verandah between the eastern facade and the gateway to an adjacent tomb, enhancing its frontal appearance.

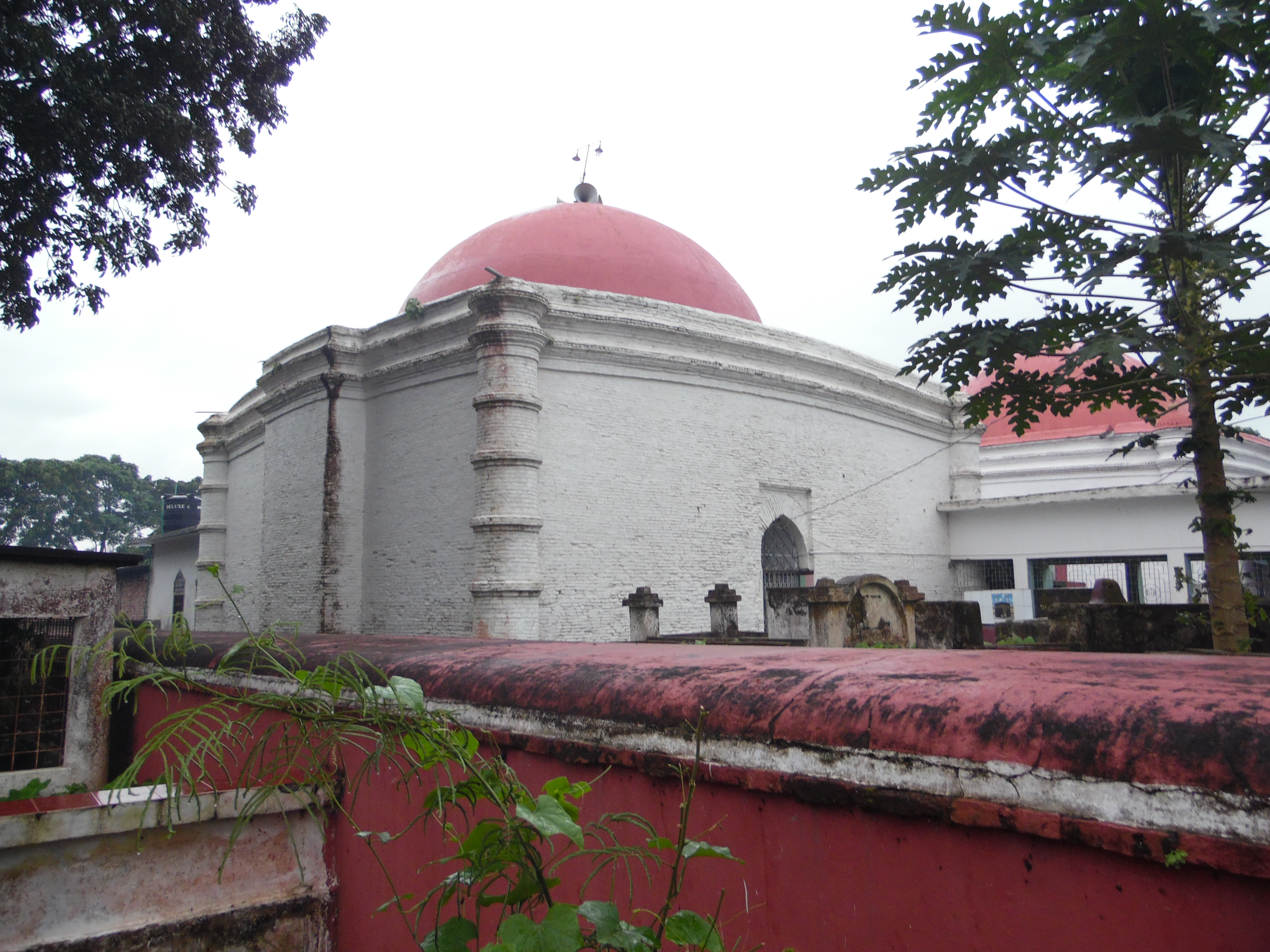
Back view of the mosque of Khan Jahan Ali

==== Architecture and Dimensions ====
The mosque's interior measures 7.90 m (25.9 ft) square, with walls 2.20 m (7.2 ft) thick. Constructed primarily of brick, it features stone brackets at the springing points of the squinch arches, which support a hemispherical dome. The dome is crowned with a kalasha finial. The building includes three eastern entrances, with the central one measuring 1.85 m (6.1 ft) wide and the two flanking entrances 1.05 m (3.4 ft) each. Single entrances on the northern and southern sides are 1.45 m (4.8 ft) wide. A projecting mihrab, aligned with the central eastern entrance, dominates the western wall, flanked by two niches on either side. Additional niches are present on the northern and southern walls, adjacent to their respective entrances. The exterior features four engaged circular towers at the corners, with a curved cornice.

==== Design and Decoration ====
The mosque exhibits minimal exterior ornamentation, characteristic of the Khan Jahan style. Two cornice mouldings encircle the building, adorned with lozenge bands. The corner towers are decorated with five additional mouldings displaying lozenge and triangle patterns, with the lowest moulding combining lozenges and rosettes. The arches of the doorways, mihrab, and niches are set within recessed panels, and the mihrab features a semicircular form with a half-dome and an elegant trefoil-cusped pointed arch. The interior lacks original decoration, having been covered with modern ceramic tiles up to the level of the squinch arches, with lime wash applied above. Despite this, the original arch shapes remain intact.

=== Khan Jahan Ali's Tank (Dighi) ===
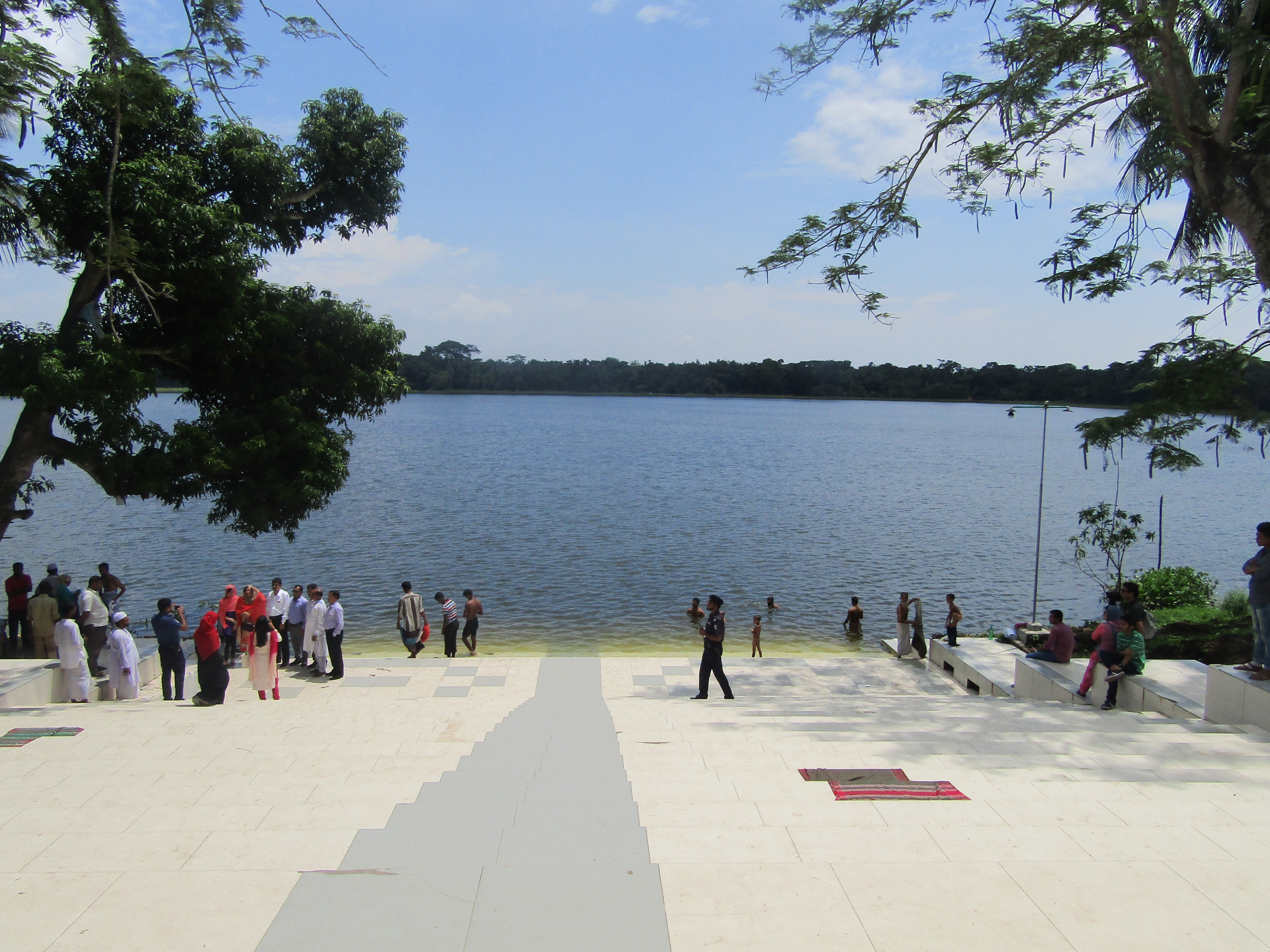
Thakur Dighi known as Khan Jahan Ali Dighi

The Khan Jahan Ali Dargah Dighi, spans approximately 200 acres (81 ha), situated adjacent to the tomb complex of Khan Jahan Ali. Excavated under Khan Jahan Ali's supervision, the dighi was designed to provide potable water for the local community. To safeguard its water quality, a pair of freshwater crocodiles was introduced into the lake, initiating a lineage that has inhabited the dighi for nearly six centuries. As of 2025, the lake is home to one male crocodile from an earlier period and three of the four freshwater crocodiles imported from Madras, India in 2005. The crocodiles of the Khan Jahan Ali Dargah are associated with a rich tradition of local legends and cultural significance. Historically, the crocodiles’ primary food source consisted of chickens offered by visitors to the dargah. Despite the typically aggressive nature of crocodiles, the lineage residing in the dighi is noted for its unusually docile behavior, a characteristic attributed to their long-term habitation within the sacred precincts of the dargah.

== Gallery ==
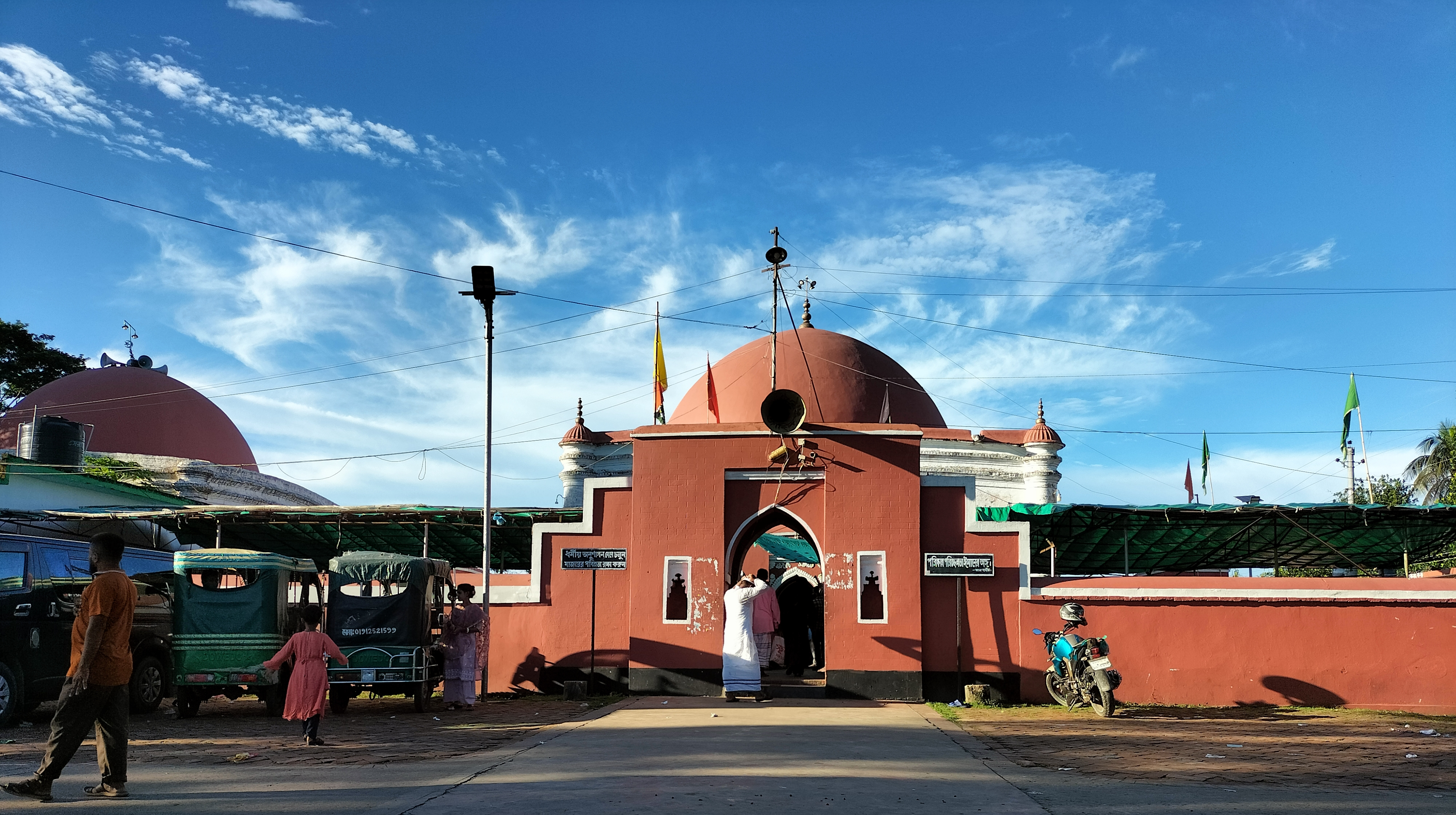
The front gate of the complex

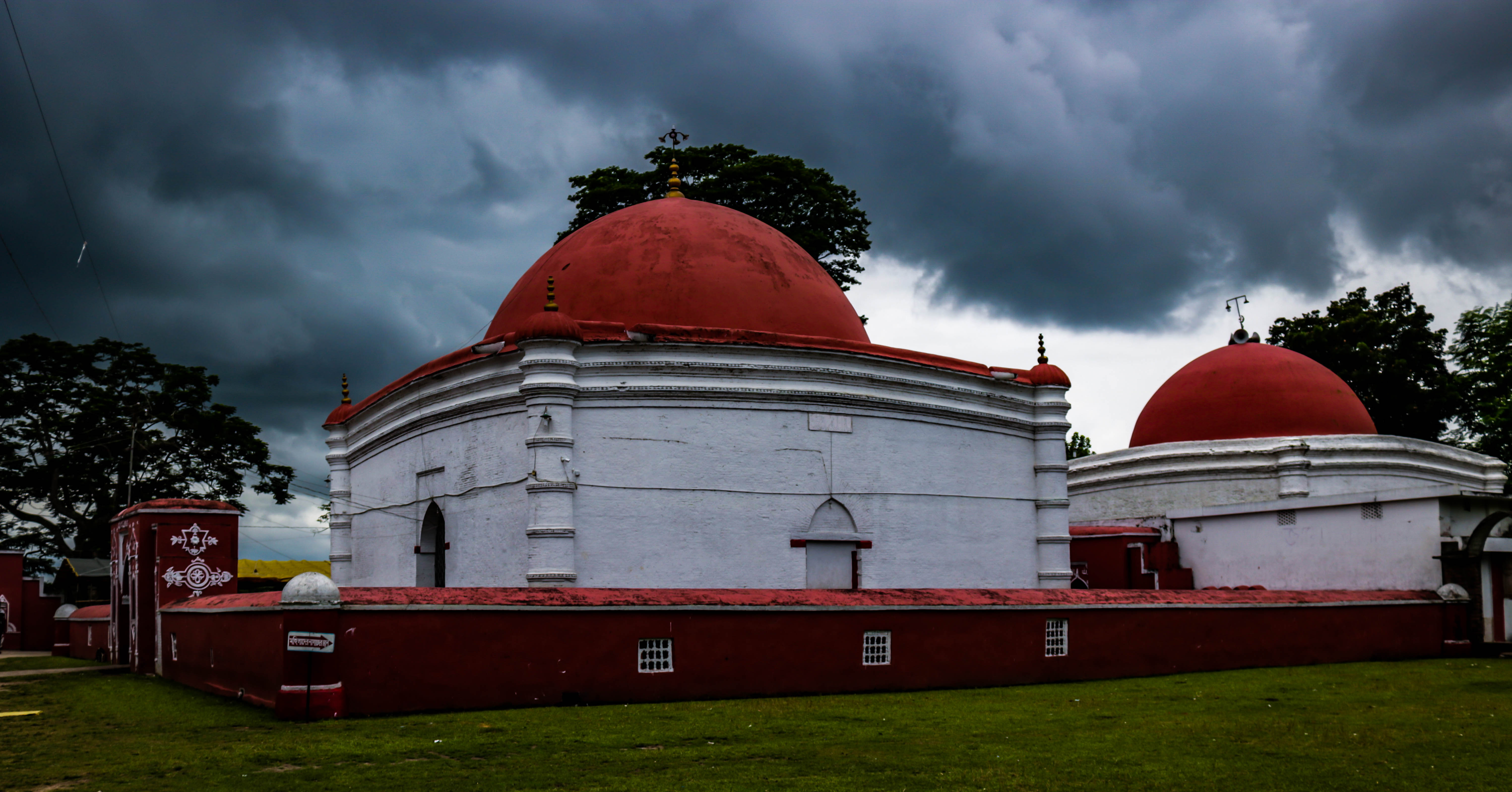
Tomb and mosque view

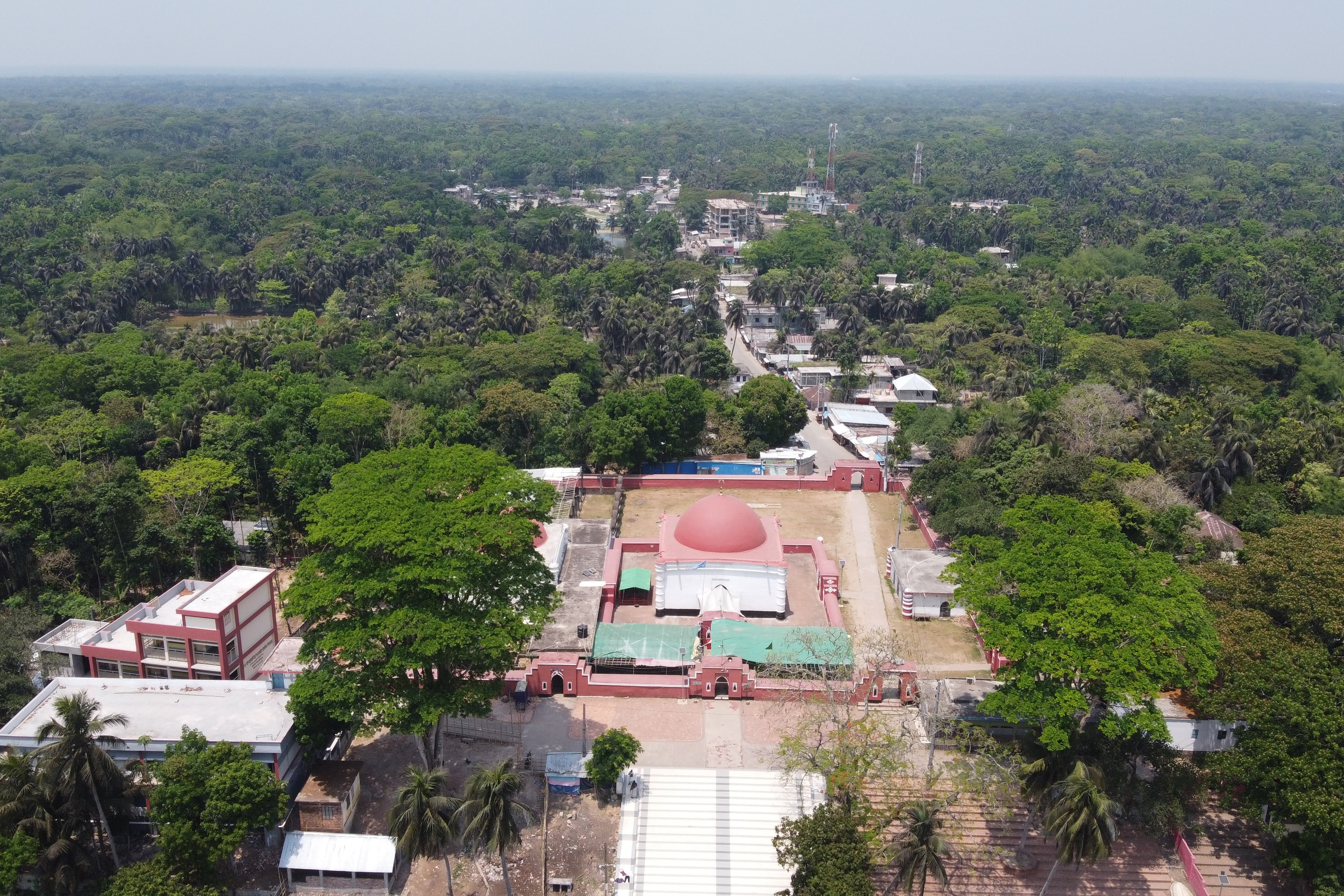
Aerial view of the dargah complex

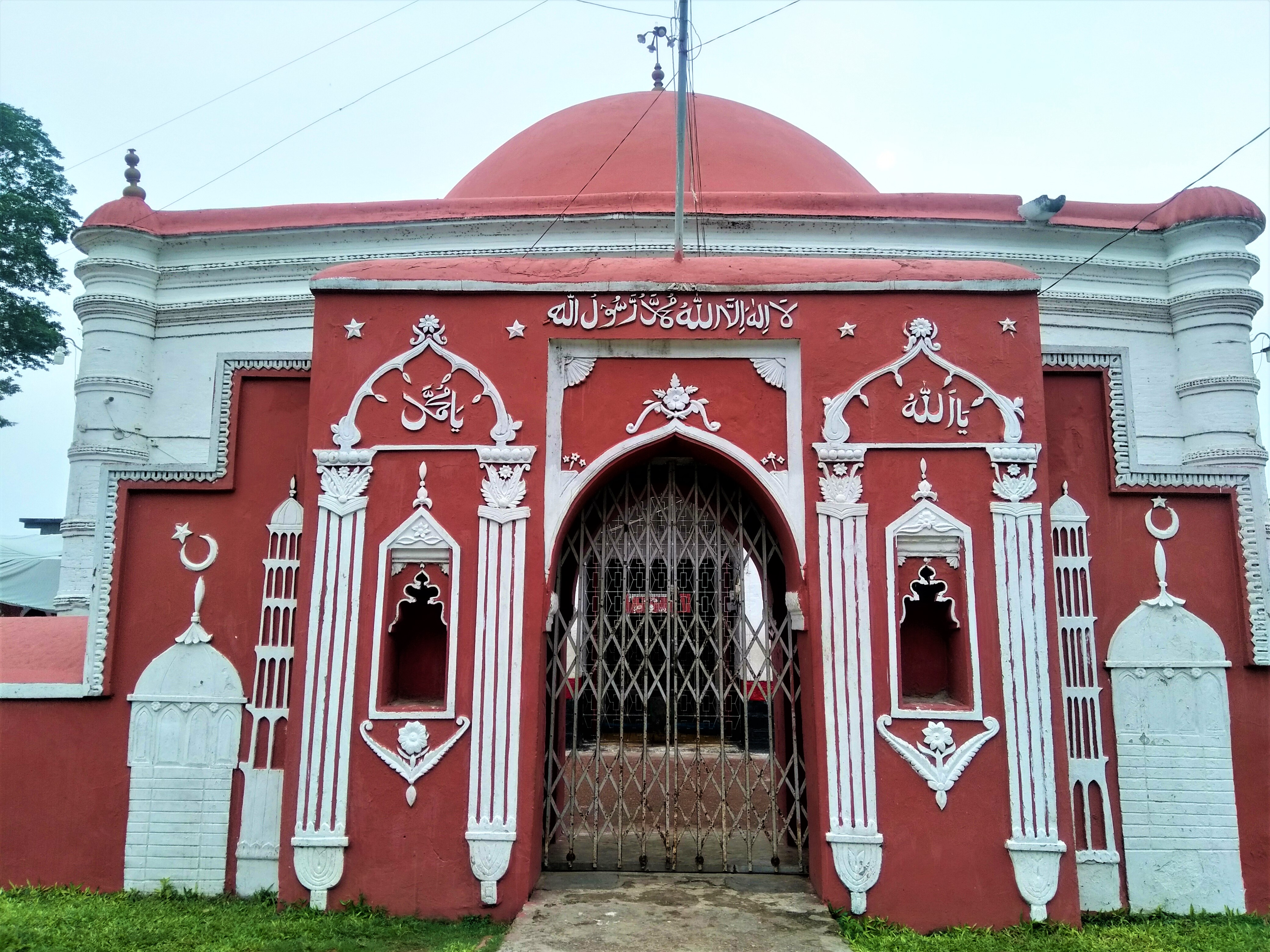
Main entrance to the tomb

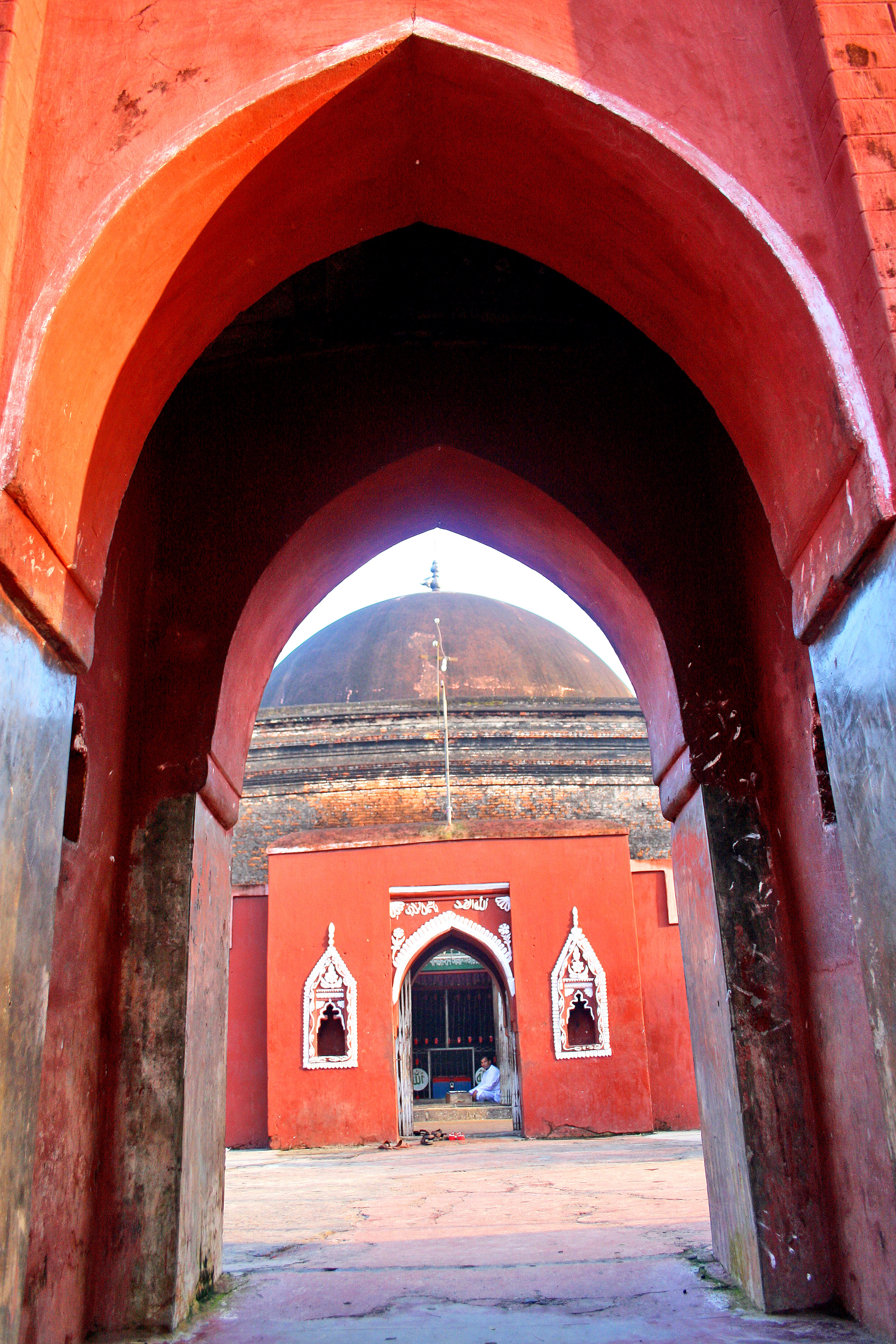
Main entrance of the complex

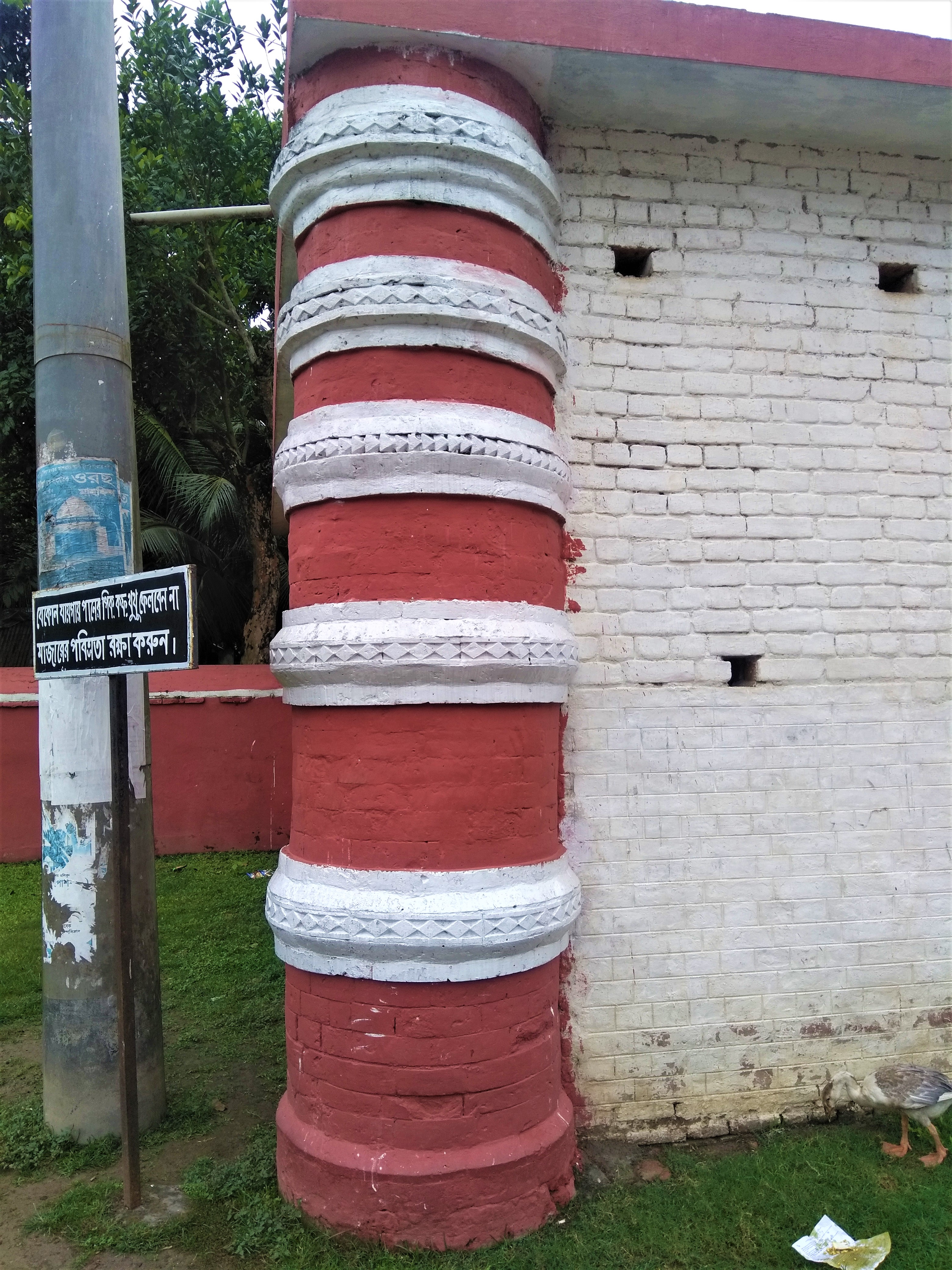
Pillars of the mausoleum structures

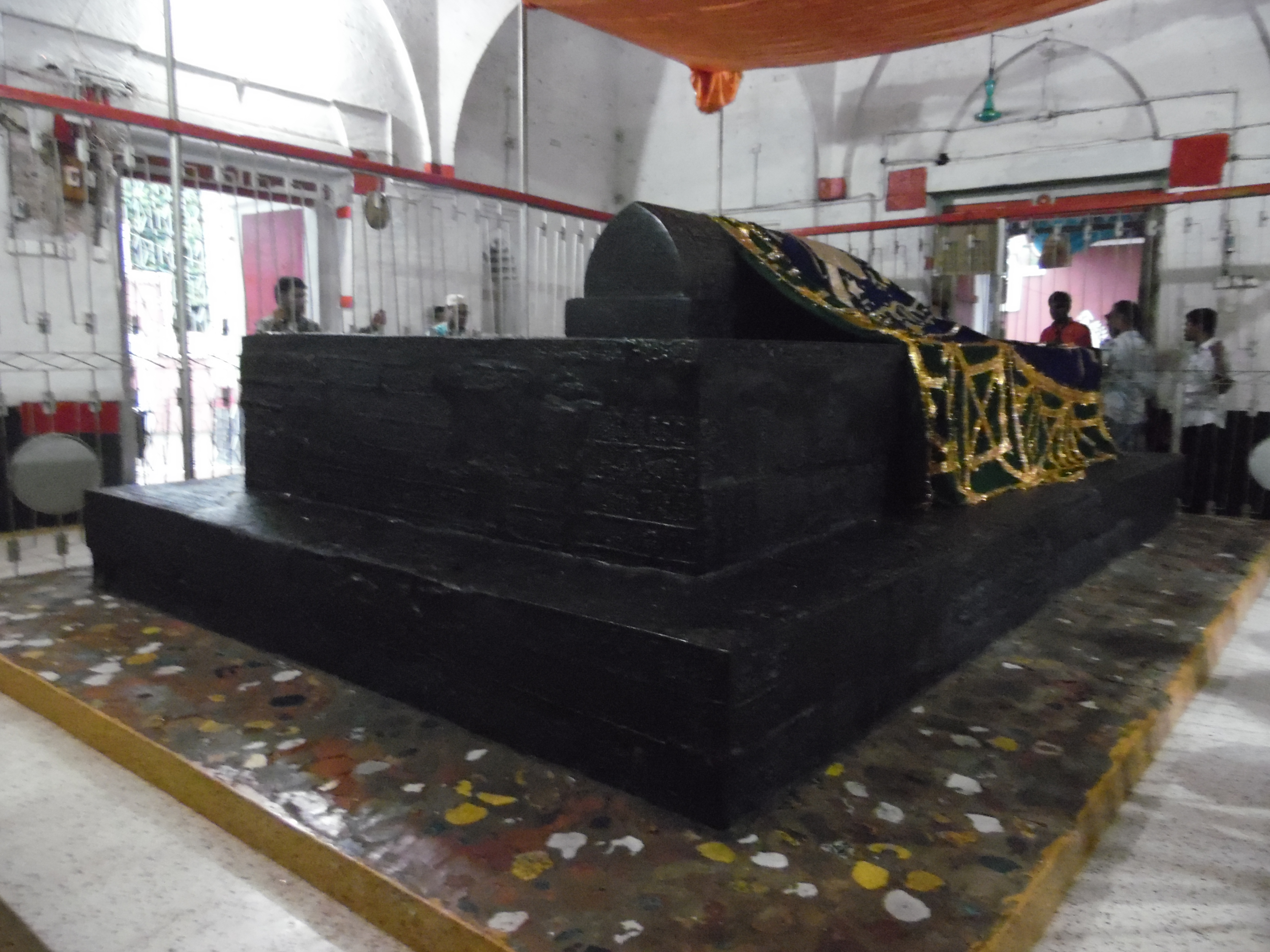
Tomb of Khan Jahan Ali

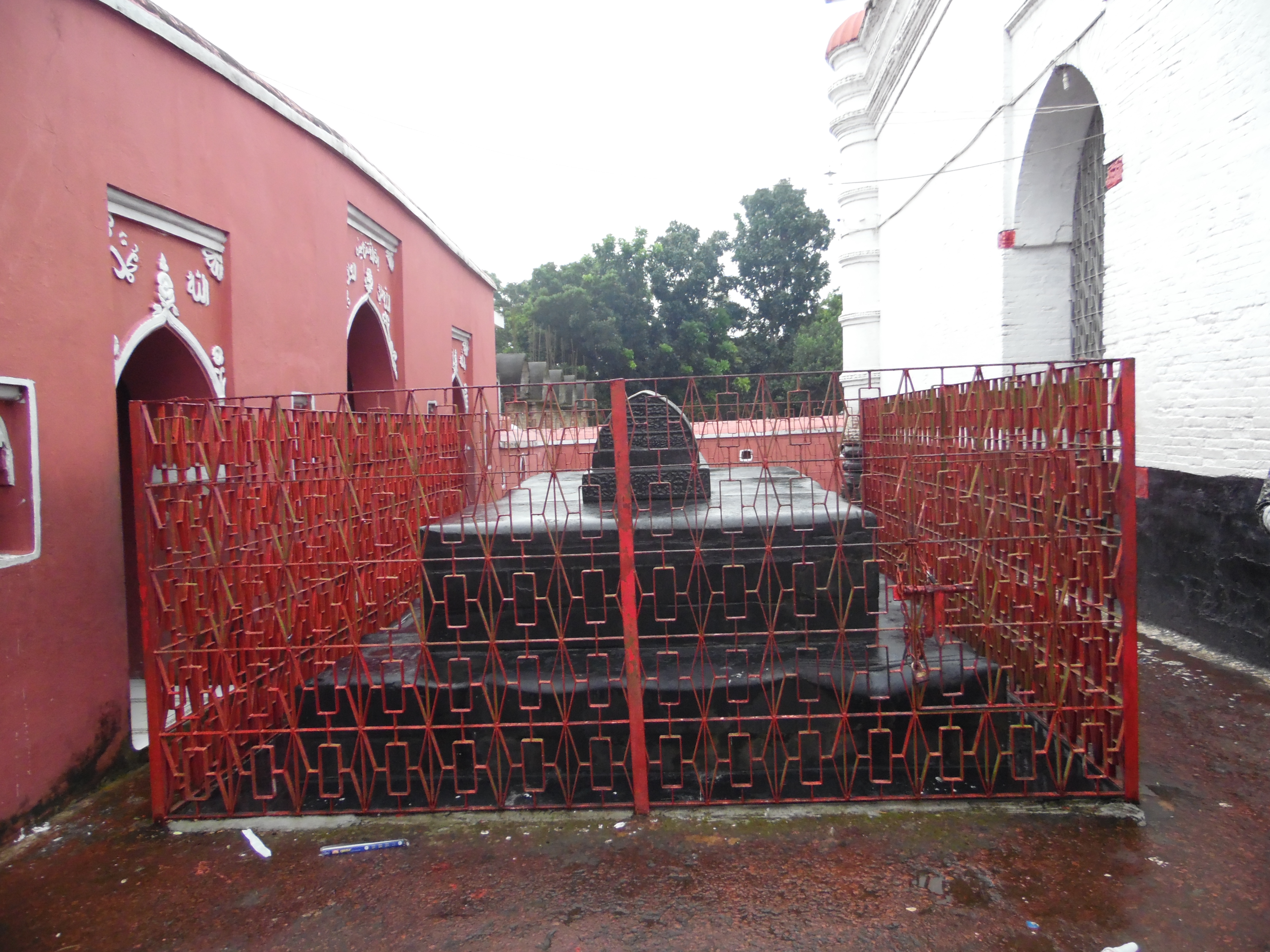
Tomb of Pir Ali, situated beside the main mausoleum

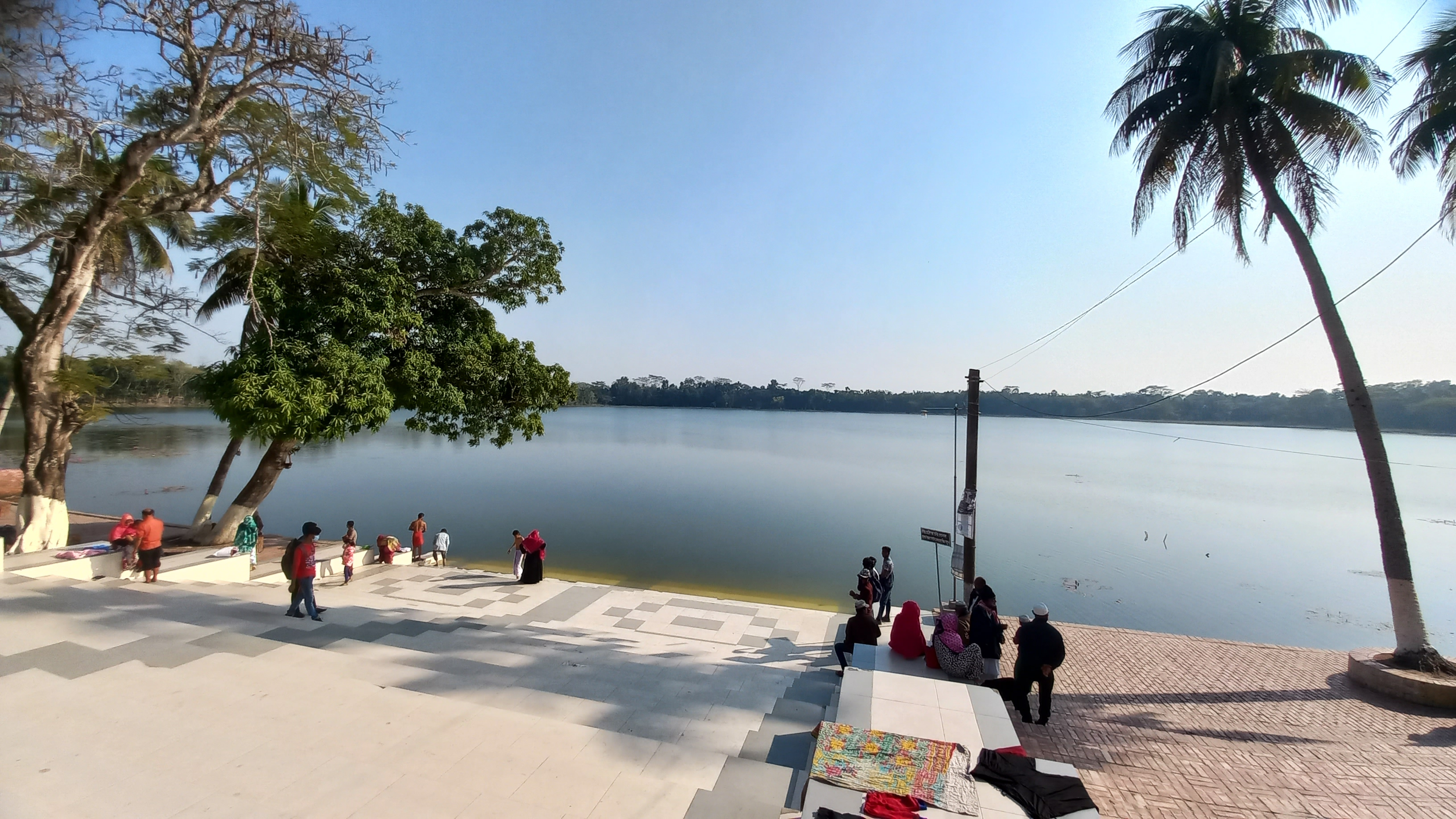
The Thakur Dighi (Bengali: ঠাকুর দিঘি) known as Khan Jahan Ali's tank

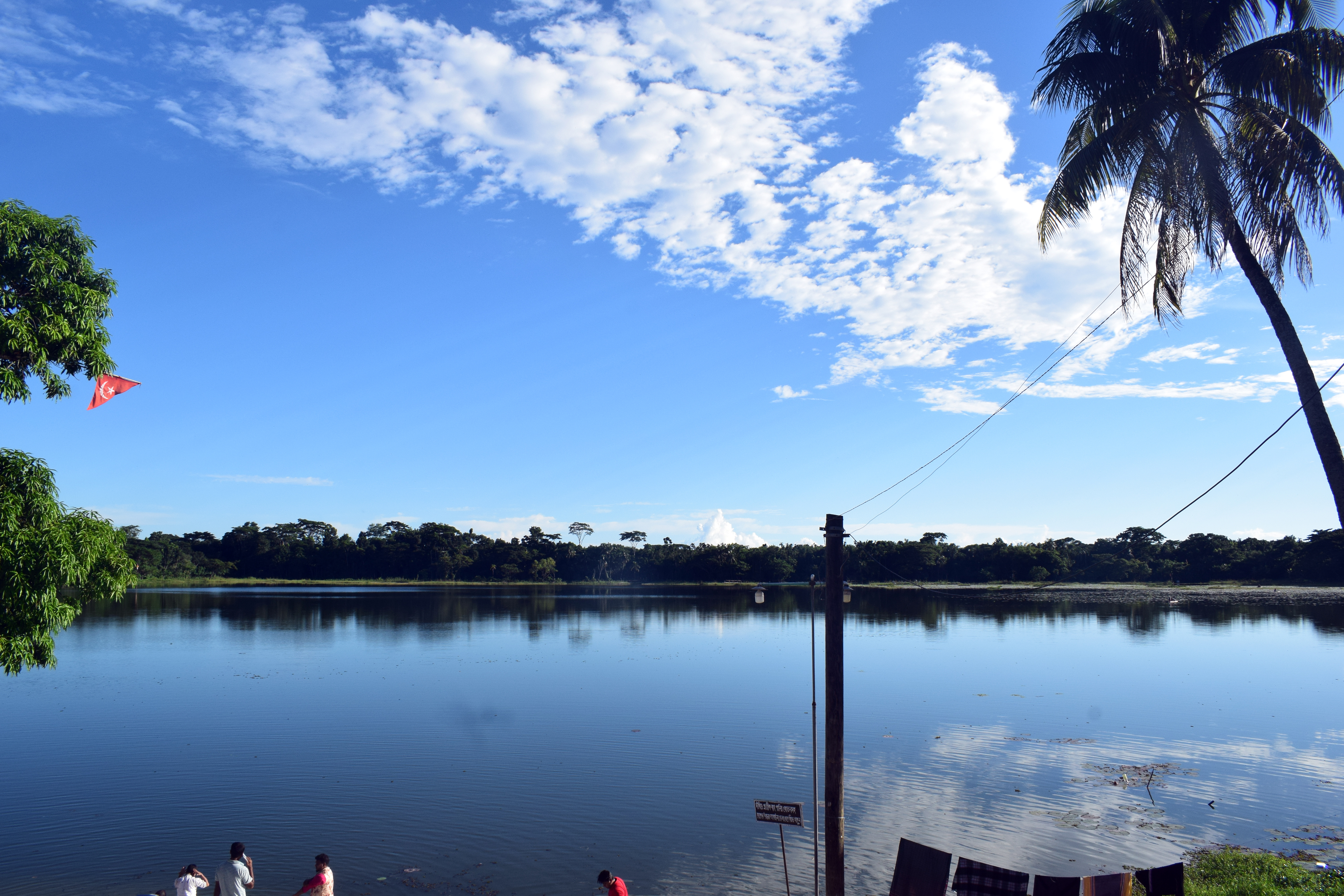
The tank covering an area of 200 acres.

== See also ==
- Singair Mosque
- Bibi Begni Mosque
- Sixty Dome Mosque

== Bibliography ==
- Hasan, Perween (2024). Sultans and Mosques: The Early Muslim Architecture of Bangladesh. Bloomsbury Academic. ISBN 978-0-7556-5360-7.
- Michell, George (1984). The Islamic Heritage of Bengal. UNESCO. ISBN 978-92-3-102174-9.
