= Rakhalgachi Union, Bagerhat Sadar =

Rakhalgachi Union রাখালগাছি ইউনিয়ন
- Union
- Rakhalgachi Union
- Country: Bangladesh
- Division: Khulna
- District: Bagerhat
- Upazila: Bagerhat Sadar
- Established: 1961

Area
  - Total: 47.27 km^{2} (18.25 sq mi)

Population (2011)
  - Total: 18,050
  - Density: 381.8/km^{2} (989.0/sq mi)
- Time zone: UTC+6 (BST)
- Website: rakhalgachiup.bagerhat.gov.bd

Rakhalgachi Union (Bengali: রাখালগাছি ইউনিয়ন) is a Union Parishad under Bagerhat Sadar Upazila of Bagerhat District in the division of Khulna, Bangladesh. It has an area of 47.27 km2 (18.25 sq mi) and a population of 18,050.
