= Khanpur Union, Bagerhat Sadar =

Khanpur Union খানপুর ইউনিয়ন
- Union
- Khanpur Union
- Country: Bangladesh
- Division: Khulna
- District: Bagerhat
- Upazila: Bagerhat Sadar

Area
  - Total: 55.32 km^{2} (21.36 sq mi)

Population (2011)
  - Total: 18,986
  - Density: 343.2/km^{2} (888.9/sq mi)
- Time zone: UTC+6 (BST)
- Website: khanpurup.bagerhat.gov.bd

Khanpur Union (Bengali: খানপুর ইউনিয়ন) is a Union Parishad under Bagerhat Sadar Upazila of Bagerhat District in the division of Khulna, Bangladesh. It has an area of 55.32 km2 (21.36 sq mi) and a population of 18,986.
