= Bishnapur Union, Bagerhat Sadar =

Bishnapur Union বিষ্ণুপুর ইউনিয়ন
- Union
- Karapara Union
- Country: Bangladesh
- Division: Khulna
- District: Bagerhat
- Upazila: Bagerhat Sadar

Area
  - Total: 46.93 km^{2} (18.12 sq mi)

Population (2011)
  - Total: 14,385
  - Density: 306.5/km^{2} (793.9/sq mi)
- Time zone: UTC+6 (BST)
- Website: bishnapurup.bagerhat.gov.bd

Bishnapur Union (Bengali: কাড়াপাড়া ইউনিয়ন) is a Union Parishad under Bagerhat Sadar Upazila of Bagerhat District in the division of Khulna, Bangladesh. It has an area of 46.93 km2 (18.12 sq mi) and a population of 14,385.
