= Karapara Union =

Karapara Union কাড়াপাড়া ইউনিয়ন
- Union
- Karapara Union
- Country: Bangladesh
- Division: Khulna
- District: Bagerhat
- Upazila: Bagerhat Sadar
- Established: 1961

Area
  - Total: 17.35 km^{2} (6.70 sq mi)

Population (2011)
  - Total: 33,552
  - Density: 1,934/km^{2} (5,009/sq mi)
- Time zone: UTC+6 (BST)
- Website: karaparaup.bagerhat.gov.bd

Karapara Union (Bengali: কাড়াপাড়া ইউনিয়ন) is a union parishad under Bagerhat Sadar Upazila of Bagerhat District in the division of Khulna, Bangladesh.
