= Khan Jahan Ali =

Muslim saint of Bengal (15th century)

Khan-i-Azam Khan Jahan
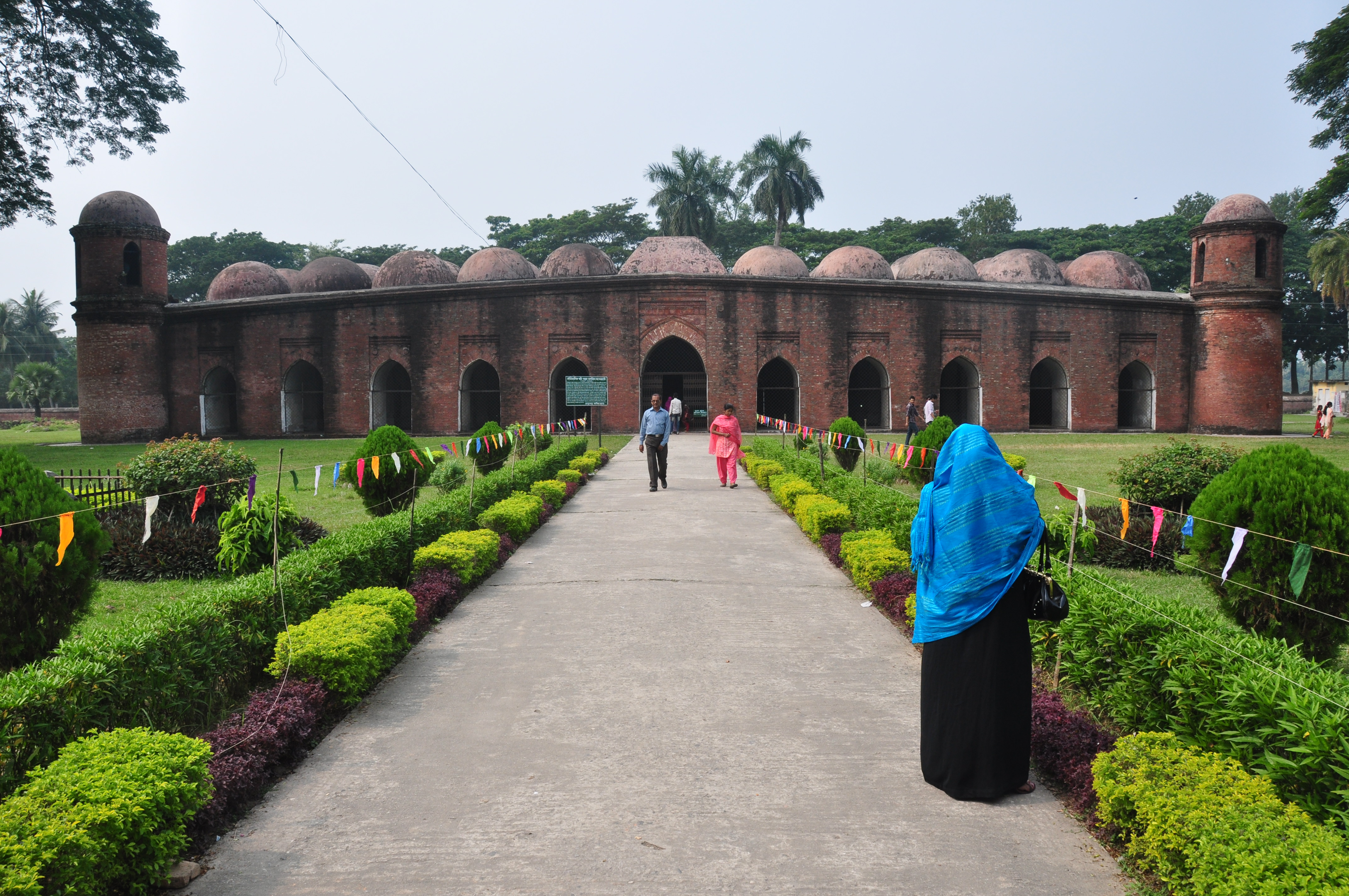

Personal life
- Born: c. 1375
- Died: 25 October 1459 C.E. Khalifatabad, Bengal Sultanate
- Resting place: Mazar of Khan Jahan Ali, Bagerhat, Khulna, Bangladesh
- Other names: Khanjali, Khwaja Ali

Religious life
- Religion: Islam

Muslim leader
- Period in office: 15th century
- Disciples: Wazil Khan

Khan Jahan Ali or Ulugh Khān (Bengali: উলুগ খান জাহান) was a Muslim saint and the Khan-i-Azam of Khalifatabad (now in Bangladesh). It is believed that he built the great Mosque City of Bagerhat, now a UNESCO World Heritage Site.

== Background and early life ==
Khan Jahan Ali was born in 1375. He is also known by the name "Ulugh Khan", and this suggests that he is of Turkic, possibly Uzbek origin. Initially a noble under the Tughlaq Sultanate, Khan Jahan seems to have migrated to Bengal following the Capture of Delhi by the Timurid Empire led by Timur in 1398.

== Migration ==
After migrating to Bengal, Khan and his companions were welcomed by 12 Muslim saints to Champanagar (which was renamed Barobazar after the 12 saints). Khan stayed here for a number of years. 126 dighis are attributed to him and mosques built during his stay include Gorar, Galakata, Joradhibi, Pir Pukur, Satgachia, Monohar, Sukkur Mollick, Nungola, Pathagar and Adina. Damdama and the dighis of Galakata and Saudagar can also be found here. Khan completed the road built by Ghazi, which originally went from Barobazar to Jessore, extending it to Bagerhat.

Khan was able to acquire a forest area in the Sundarbans as a jagir from Sultan Mahmud Shah of Bengal. The official title Khan-i-Azam was given to him displaying that he was an officer and local ruler under the Sultanate of Bengal. Khan worked with his two deputies, Burhan Bura Khan and his son, Fateh Khan, to clear up a lot of dense forest area in order to set up human settlements and rice cultivation. He and his group of sappers embanked the land along streams to keep saltwater out and dug hundreds of tanks (known as dighis) for water storage. This area he governed came to be known as Khalifatabad and stretched up north to Naldi in Lohagara. He built numerous mosques here such as Singar, Bibi Begni, Chunakhola, Ranabijoypur, Nine Dome, Zinda Pir's Tomb Complex and Reza Khoda as well as the Ghora dighi. Most notably, he built the Sixty Dome Mosque which was one of the largest during this period.

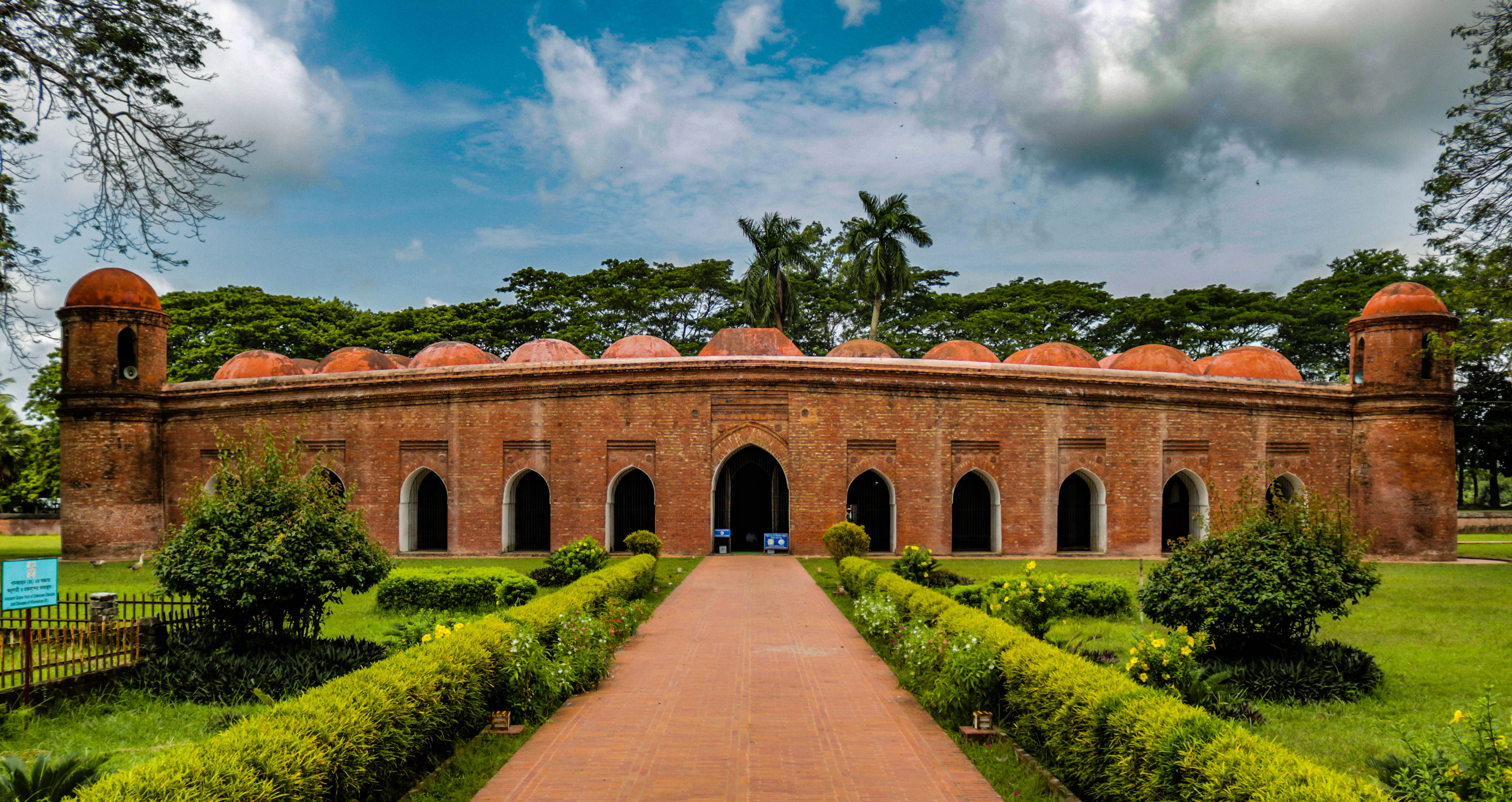
The Sixty Dome Mosque has been described as "one of the most impressive Muslim monuments in the whole of the Indian subcontinent."

Khan also travelled to Jessore where he established the township of Murali-Qasba. It was situated near a number of small towns such as Bogchar and he built a road to connect them all (now known as Khanjalir Jangal). He left behind two disciples here, Gharib Shah and Beram Shah; to carry on preaching Islam as he continued. The tombs of Beram Shah, Burhan Khan and Fateh Khan, dighis of Sarbabad, Mirzapur, Lashkar and mosques of Mathbari, Maguraghona, Masjidkur, Gharib Shah, Shubharara Mosque are located in Murali-Qasba. In Phultala, he established the Poyogram-Qasba. Two mosques that were built here were as large as the Sixty Dome Mosque but are now ruins. The roads in this town had a "rectangular cheeseboard pattern". One of the roads still in use is Khanjali Road and one of the mosques which isn't in ruins here is Dakshin Dihi mosque. One of Khan's houses and Shahabatir Dighi can also be found in Poyogram.

He founded numerous caravanserais, constructing hundreds of mosques as well as madrasas, roads and bridges. There is a single-domed mosque attached to his tomb. The Sixty Dome Mosque was also used as his central assembly hall and as a madrasa. He excavated a large number of dighis (excavated water storage tanks), especially when constructing mosques to enable wudhu facilities. The most notable dighis are the Khanjali Dighi, excavated in 1450 and located near his tomb, and Ghoradighi, measuring 230 by 460 metres (750 by 1,500 ft) to the west of the Sixty Dome Mosque. He is said to have built a highway from Bagerhat to Chittagong, a 32-kilometre (20 mi) long road from Samantasena to Badhkhali, and a road running from Shuvabara to Daulatpur in Khulna.

His role as administrator of Khalifatabad did not stop him from also preaching the religion of Islam to the local people which he focused on even more after retiring. His humanitarian work such as establishment of dighis for clean water was a number of reasons why the local Hindus were attracted to Islam. He led a simple life and had a number of disciples; most notably, Shaykh Muhammad Tahir (better known as Pir Ali), who is buried near him. It is unknown how, but Khan died on 25 October 1459 (27 Dhul Hijjah 863 AH).

== Legacy ==
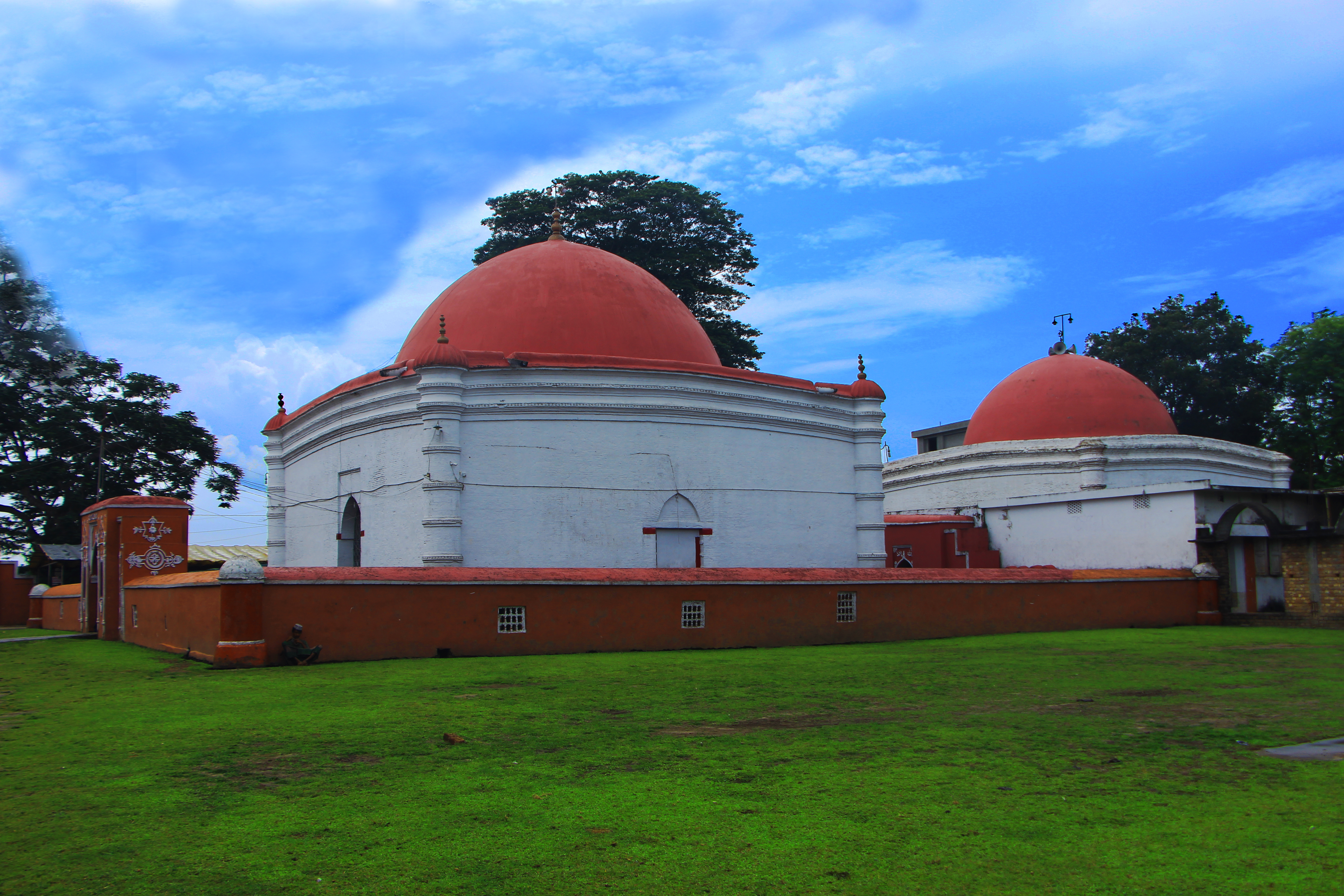
The mausoleum housing the tomb of Khan Jahan Ali.

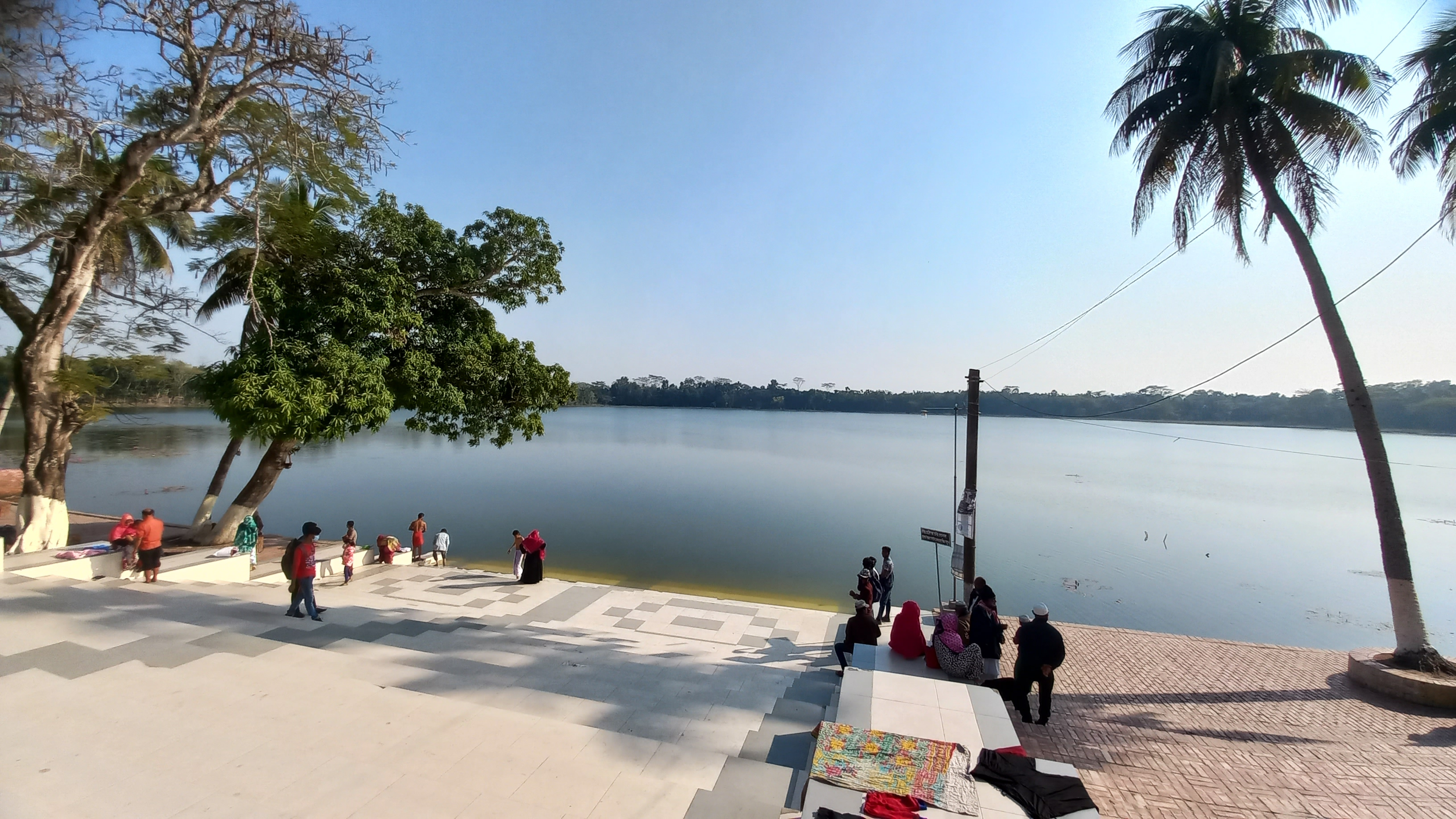
Khan Jahan Ali's Tank in front of the tomb of Khan Jahan Ali

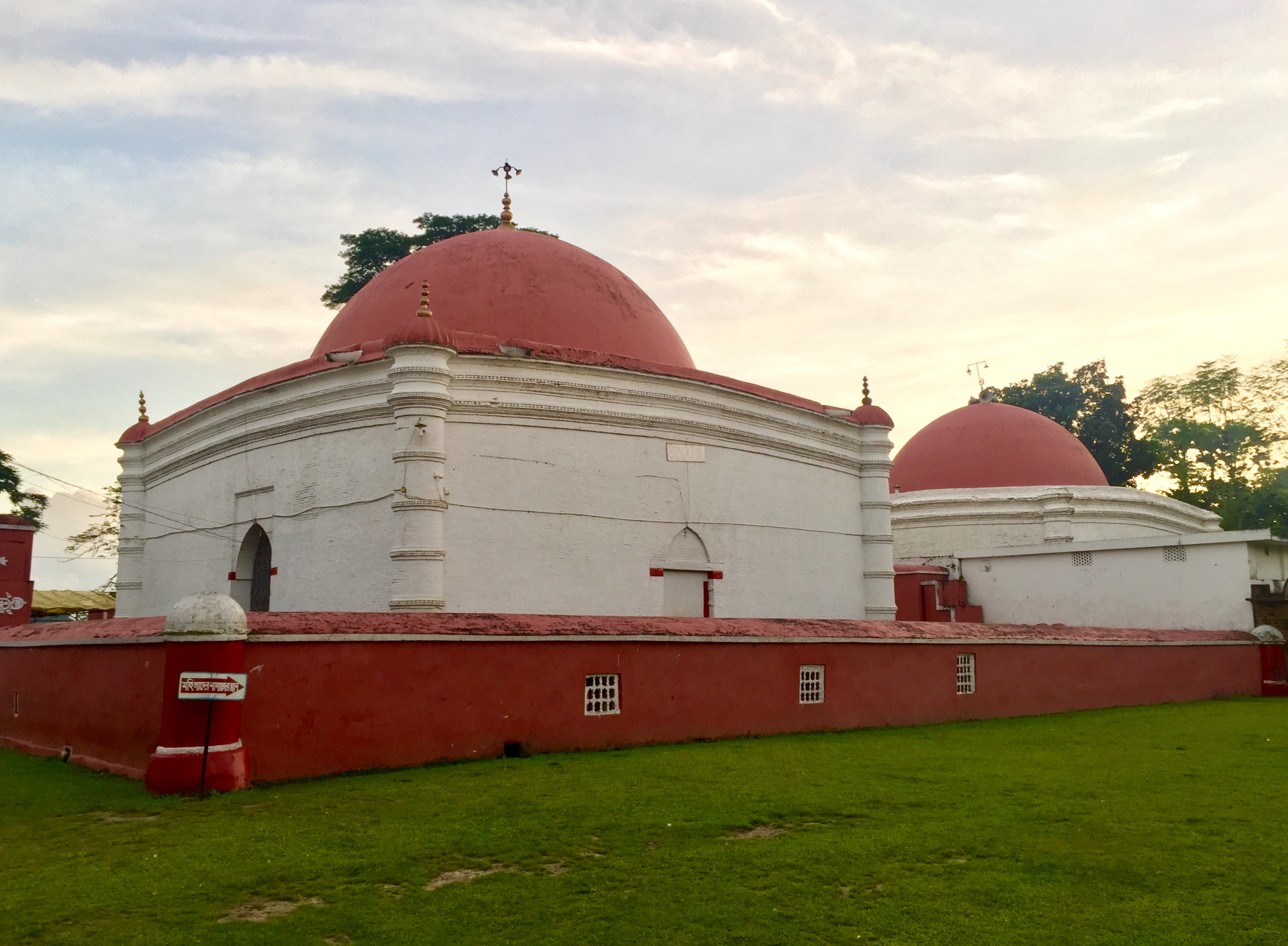
Tomb and the adjoining mosque

After his death, he was buried in a mazar near one of his mosques and dighis. Khan Jahan Ali's Tank contains crocodiles which are considered to be descended from the two crocodiles which Khan rode on. The great-grandmother of Haji Faqir Humayun Kabir, a guardian of the shrine, is said to have fought with them. Hundreds of visitors visit the shrine everyday, and also pet the resident crocodiles.

Khan Jahan introduced a new architectural style in his buildings, which is named after him. The Khan Jahan style architecture is seen throughout the modern-day Khulna Division. The Khan Jahan Ali Airport is a proposed airport in Mongla to be named after him.

One of the Bangladesh Navy's auxiliary ships is named after him as "BNS Khan Jahan Ali". The ship was made by Ananda Shipyard & Slipways Limited and handed to the Bangladesh Navy on 6 November 2014. The 80-metre-long tanker can carry 2,400 tons of diesel and 120 tons of aviation fuel. It can go 24.5 km per hour with full load and can refuel two war ships simultaneously. The ship was commissioned on 6 September 2015. Previously, there was an oil tanker with the name "BNS Khan Jahan Ali". This was an Ex-Soho Maru (T1056) made by Setoda's Naikai Shipbuilding in 1963. It was sold after 1983 and commissioned on 14 July 1987 as a naval tanker. It was decommissioned after 28 years on 5 September 2015.

== List of the things named after Khan Jahan Ali ==
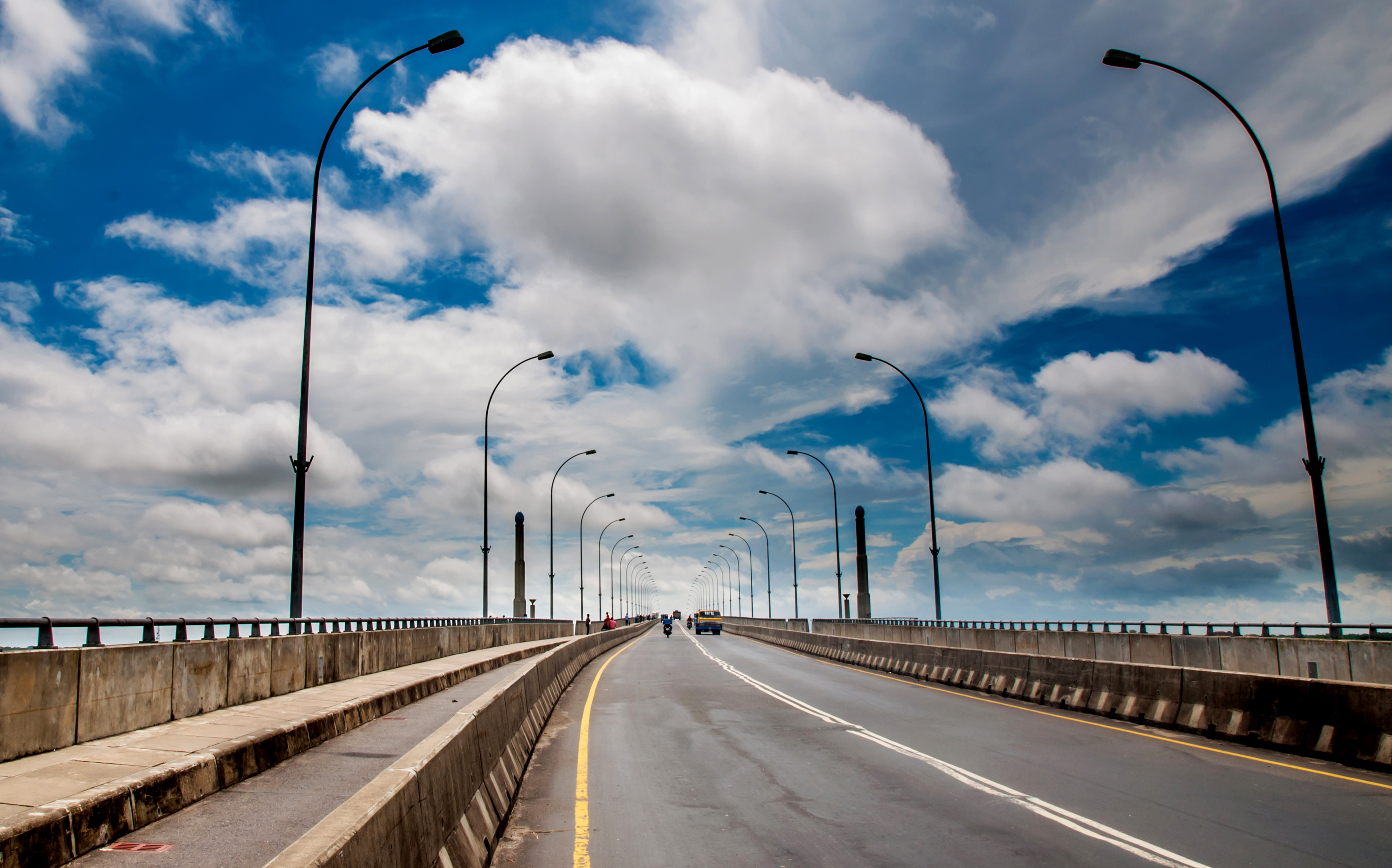
The Khan Jahan Ali Bridge was inaugurated in 2005, and is referred to as the gateway of Khulna.

- Khan Jahan Ali Bridge
- Khan Jahan Ali Airport
- Khan Jahan Ali Thana, Khulna
- Khan Jahan Ali Hall (student's hostel) in KUET
- Khan Jahan Ali Hall (student's hostel) in Khulna University
- Khan Jahan Ali Road, Khulna
- Khan Jahan Ali Ideal College, Shiromoni, Khulna.
- Khan Jahan Ali Degree College, Bagerhat.

== See also ==
- Mosque City of Bagerhat
- Khan Jahan Ali Airport
- Mausoleum of Khan Jahan Ali
