= Baruipara Union =

Baruipara Union বারুইপাড়া ইউনিয়ন
- Union
- Baruipara Union
- Country: Bangladesh
- Division: Khulna
- District: Bagerhat
- Upazila: Bagerhat Sadar

Area
  - Total: 40.71 km^{2} (15.72 sq mi)

Population (2011)
  - Total: 39,553
  - Density: 971.6/km^{2} (2,516/sq mi)
- Time zone: UTC+6 (BST)
- Website: baruiparaup.bagerhat.gov.bd

Baruipara Union (Bengali: বারুইপাড়া ইউনিয়ন) is a Union Parishad under Bagerhat Sadar Upazila of Bagerhat District in the division of Khulna, Bangladesh. It has an area of 40.71 km2 (15.72 sq mi) and a population of 39,553.
