= Jatrapur Union, Bagerhat Sadar =

Jatrapur Union যাত্রাপুর ইউনিয়ন
- Union
- Jatrapur Union
- Country: Bangladesh
- Division: Khulna
- District: Bagerhat
- Upazila: Bagerhat Sadar
- Established: 1961

Area
  - Total: 26.00 km^{2} (10.04 sq mi)

Population (2011)
  - Total: 22,071
  - Density: 848.9/km^{2} (2,199/sq mi)
- Time zone: UTC+6 (BST)
- Website: jatharapurup.bagerhat.gov.bd

Jatrapur Union (Bengali: যাত্রাপুর ইউনিয়ন) is a Union Parishad under Bagerhat Sadar Upazila of Bagerhat District in the division of Khulna, Bangladesh. It has an area of 26.00 km2 (10.04 sq mi) and a population of 22,071.
