= Zinda Pir's Tomb Complex =

Mosque and Tomb site of Zinda Pir

Zinda Pir's Mazar
- জিন্দাপীরের মাজার
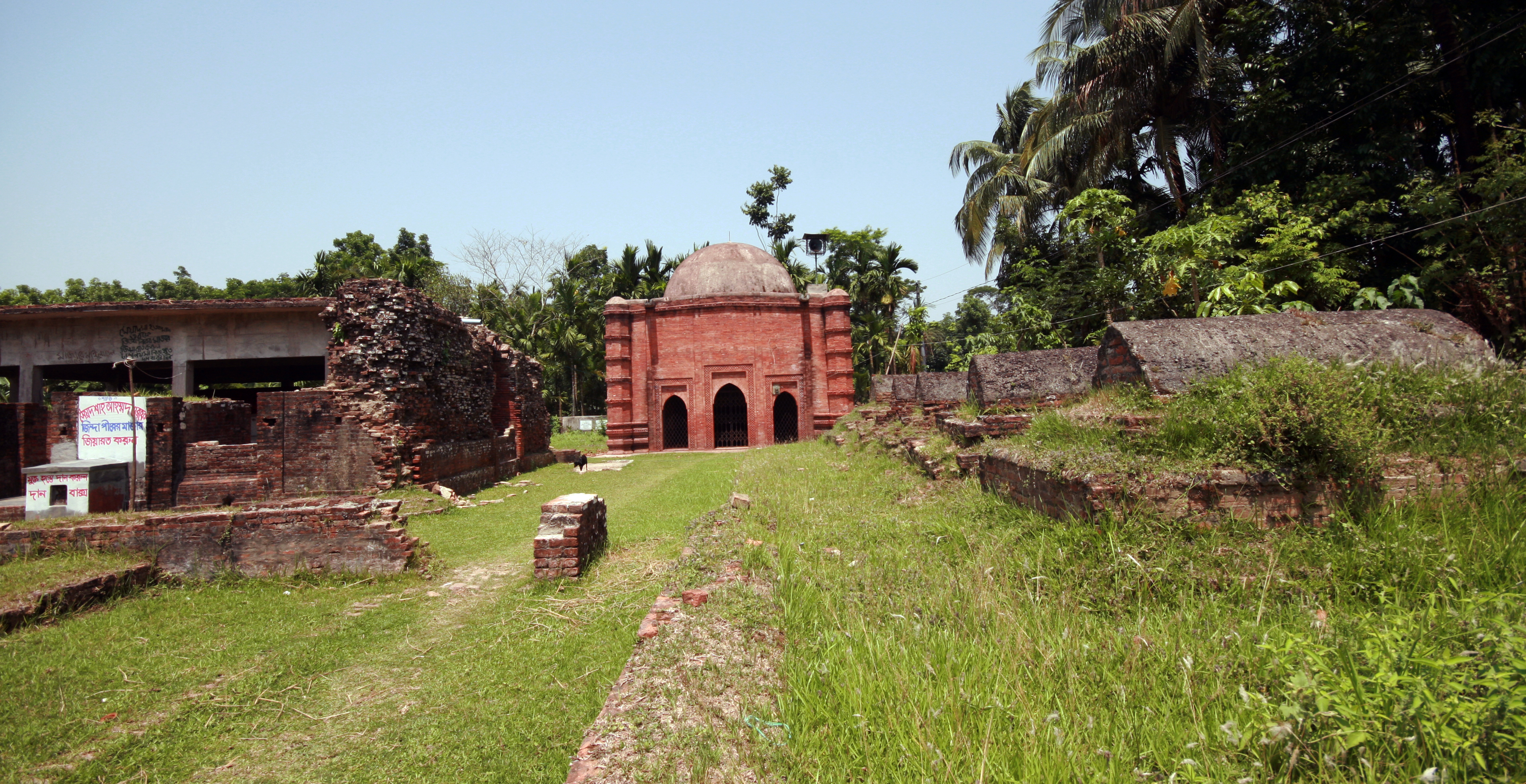
- Tomb of Zinda Pir (left), Zinda Pir Mosque (center), unknown tombs (right)

- Location of the mosque in Bangladesh

Religion
- Affiliation: Islam
- Ecclesiastical or organizational status: Mosque, Tomb
- Status: Active

Location
- Location: Ranbijoypur, Bagerhat, Khulna
- Country: Bangladesh
- Interactive map of Zinda Pir's Mazar
- Administration: Department of Archaeology
- Coordinates: 22.661798°N 89.754017°E

Architecture
- Type: Mosque architecture
- Style: Bengal Sultanate
- Established: Late 16th century

Specifications
- Dome: One
- Site area: 33.22 m^{2} (357.6 ft^{2})

The Zinda Pir's Tomb Complex, known as Zinda Pir's Mazar (Bengali: জিন্দাপীরের মাজার) situated half a kilometres west of Khan Jahan's tomb in Bagerhat, is traditionally associated with a saint identified as Ahmad Ali. The name of Zinda Pir translates to “Living Saint”. Enclosed within a square outer wall measuring 33.22 meters per side, the complex includes a single-domed tomb for the saint, a single-domed mosque, and several brick-built graves attributed to the saint's family members. According to local tradition, the saint's residence, now lost, was located to the north of the complex. The mosque architecture dates back to late-sixteenth century. The mosque was repaired in 2002 and declared as a protected monument in 2011 by the Department of Archeology.

== Architecture ==
=== The Mosque ===
The mosque, a single-domed square structure located northwest of the tomb, is constructed in brick. Including its octagonal corner towers, it measures 7.62 m (25.0 ft) per side externally and 4.88 m (16.0 ft) per side internally, with walls approximately 1.52 m (5.0 ft) thick. The building features three arched openings on the eastern side and one each on the northern and southern sides. Corresponding to the larger central eastern opening, a single arched mihrab is set within the qibla wall, accompanied by a typical rectangular projection on the exterior. The central entrance being the largest measures 1.30 m (4.3 ft); the other two are 1 m (3.3 ft) wide. The entrances in the north and south are 1.20 m (3.9 ft) wide.

=== Tomb of Zinda Pir ===
The tomb of Zinda Pir, is a square brick structure measuring 10.97 m (36.0 ft) per side externally, now in a heavily ruined state. The building features octagonal corner turrets, with only their bases remaining, and walls 1.52 m (5.0 ft) thick. The north wall, preserved up to 2.44 m (8.0 ft), while the other walls, repaired to 0.61 m (2.0 ft). There are three entrances on each side. Architectural elements like the octagonal towers and surface decoration suggest the tomb dates to the later Ilyas Shahi or Husain Shahi period, despite claims that Zinda Pir predates Khan Jahan.

== Gallery ==
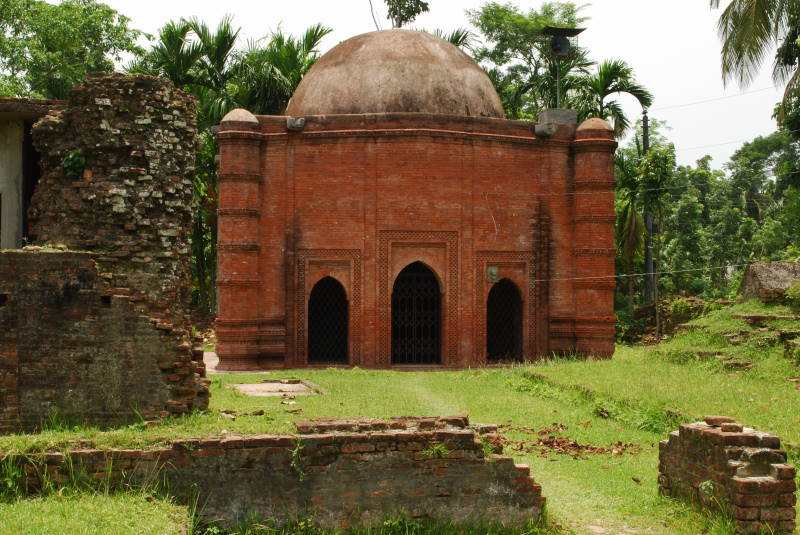
Zinda Pir Mosque

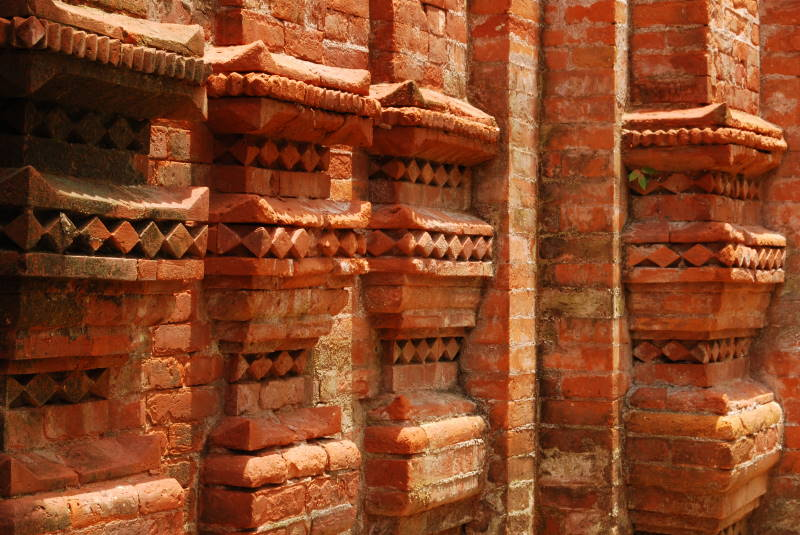
Decorations on the wall

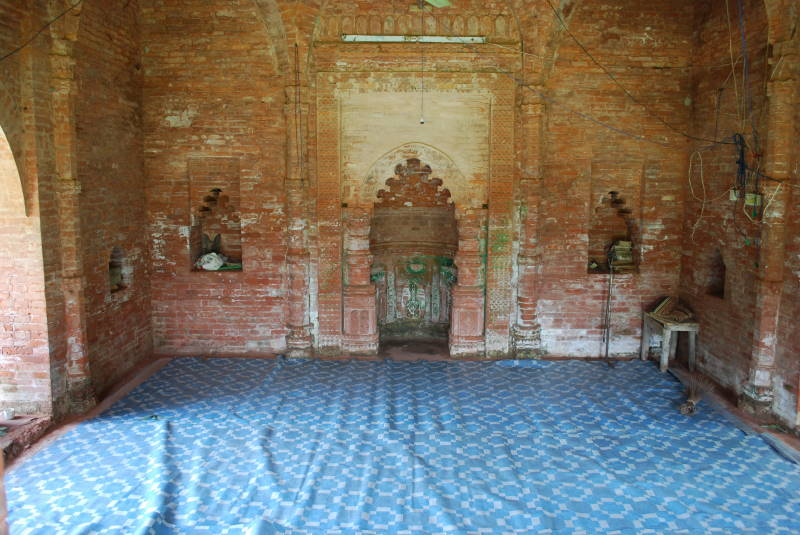
Interior of the mosque

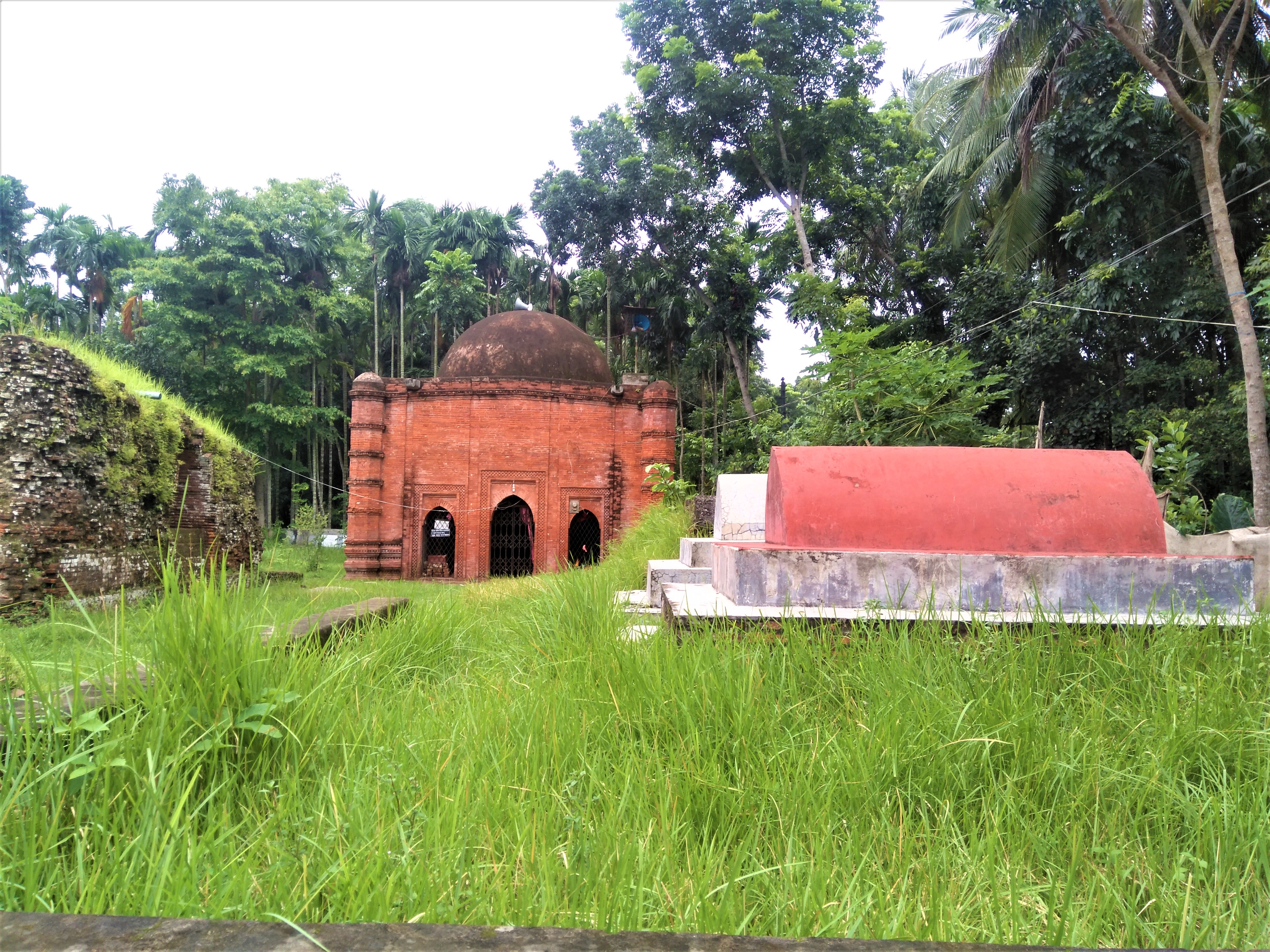
The mosque and tombs believed to be family of Zinda Pir

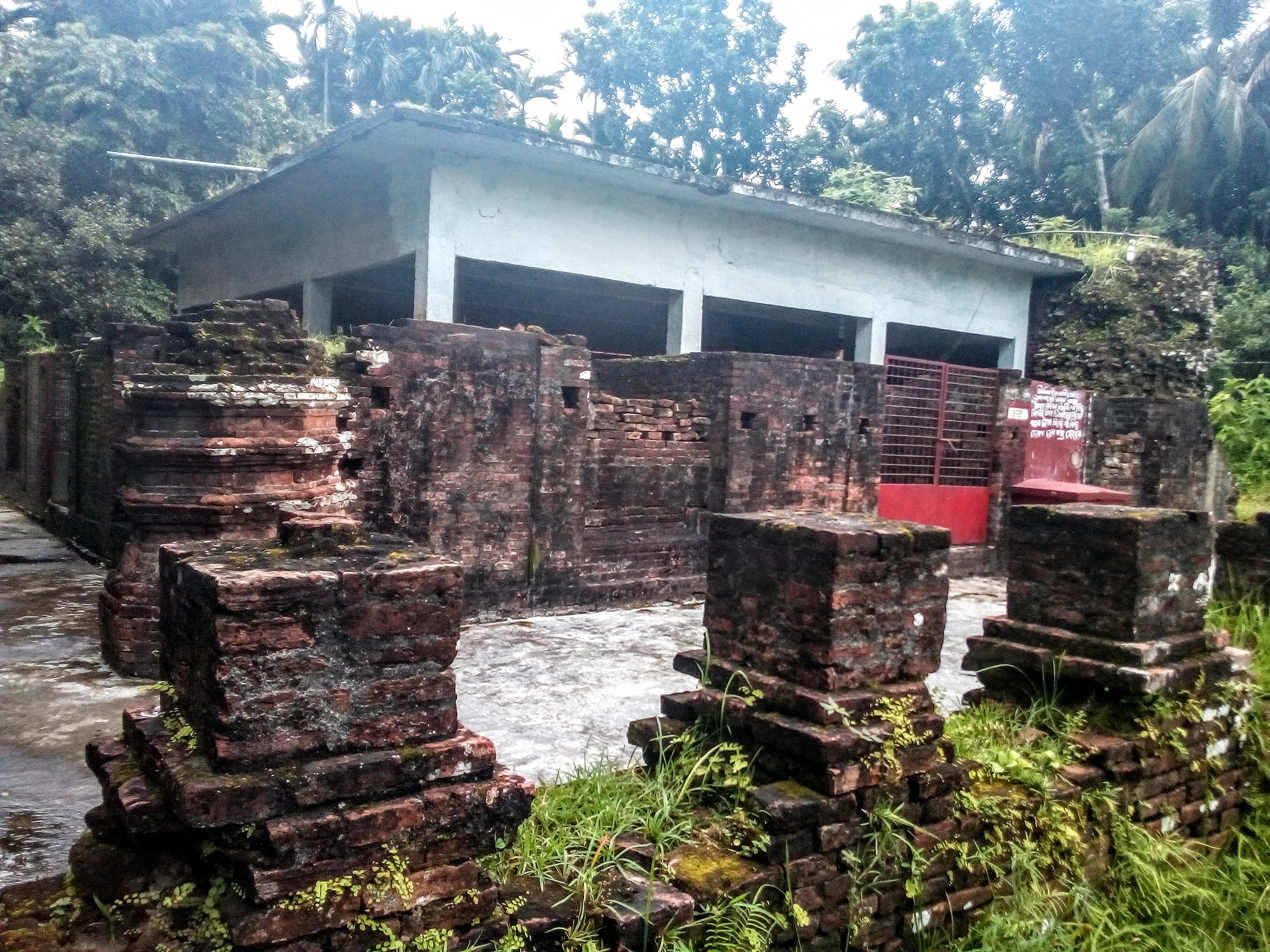
The Mausoleum compound in ruins

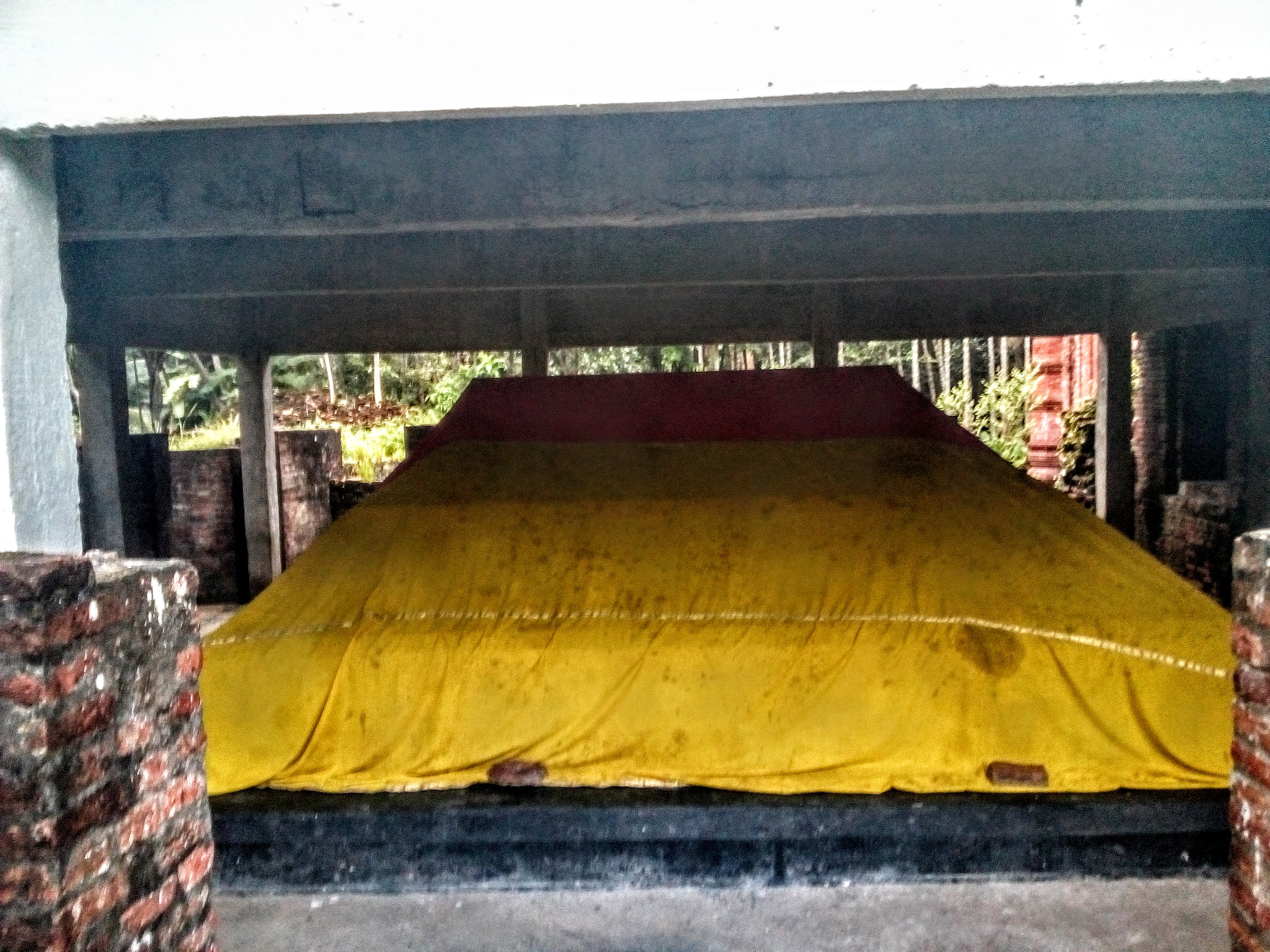
Tomb of Zinda Pir

== See also ==
- Mausoleum of Khan Jahan Ali

== Bibliography ==
- Hasan, Perween (2007). Sultans and Mosques: The Early Muslim Architecture of Bangladesh. Bloomsbury Academic. ISBN 978-1-84511-381-0.
