= Dema Union =

Dema Union ডেমা ইউনিয়ন
- Union
- Dema Union
- Country: Bangladesh
- Division: Khulna
- District: Bagerhat
- Upazila: Bagerhat Sadar
- Established: 1961

Area
  - Total: 44.21 km^{2} (17.07 sq mi)

Population (2011)
  - Total: 24,745
  - Density: 559.7/km^{2} (1,450/sq mi)
- Time zone: UTC+6 (BST)
- Website: demaup.bagerhat.gov.bd

Dema Union (Bengali: ডেমা ইউনিয়ন) is a Union Parishad under Bagerhat Sadar Upazila of Bagerhat District in Khulna Division, Bangladesh. It has an area of 44.21 km2 (17.07 sq mi) and a population of 24,745.
