= Bamorta Union =

Bamorta Union বেমরতা ইউনিয়ন
- Union
- Bamorta Union
- Country: Bangladesh
- Division: Khulna
- District: Bagerhat
- Upazila: Bagerhat Sadar
- Established: 1961

Area
  - Total: 99.87 km^{2} (38.56 sq mi)

Population (2011)
  - Total: 32,620
  - Density: 326.6/km^{2} (846.0/sq mi)
- Time zone: UTC+6 (BST)
- Website: bamortaup.bagerhat.gov.bd

Bamorta Union (Bengali: বেমরতা ইউনিয়ন) is a Union Parishad in Bagerhat Sadar Upazila of Bagerhat District in the division of Khulna, Bangladesh. It has an area of 99.87 km2 (38.56 sq mi) and a population of 32,620.

== Villages ==
1. Condola
2. Sultanpur
3. Bemorta
4. Rajapur
5. Ramachandrapur
6. Bijaypur
7. Joygasi
8. Raghunathpur
9. Khalkulia
10. Ramnagar Satagachia
11. Chargram
12. Bhadrapara
13. Baitpur
14. Chitli
15. Fatepur
16. Kalabaria
17. Arjunbahar
18. Dhanagati
19. Anardanga
20. Kapalibandor
21. Moujardanga
22. Kharasambol
23. Bergajalia
24. Dattakathi
25. Bishnupur
