= Gotapara Union =

Karapara Union গোটাপাড়া ইউনিয়ন
- Union
- Gotapara Union
- Country: Bangladesh
- Division: Khulna
- District: Bagerhat
- Upazila: Bagerhat Sadar
- Established: 1961

Area
  - Total: 30.72 km^{2} (11.86 sq mi)

Population (2011)
  - Total: 26,605
  - Density: 866.0/km^{2} (2,243/sq mi)
- Time zone: UTC+6 (BST)
- Website: gotaparaup.bagerhat.gov.bd

Gotapara Union (Bengali: গোটাপাড়া ইউনিয়ন) is a Union parishad under Bagerhat Sadar Upazila of Bagerhat District in the division of Khulna, Bangladesh. It has an area of 30.72 km² (11.86 sq mi) and a population of 26,605.

== Gotapara Union Villages with Ward No ==
    - Added by Kazi Toriqul Islam ***
1. Gopalkathi -ward-01
2. Kananpur - ward-01
3. Kaldia- ward-01
4. Keshbpur -ward-01
5. Alukdia -ward-02
6. Vatchala - ward-02
7. Baniagati - ward-02
8. Gotapara - ward-03
9. Mukkhait - ward-03
10. Paschimvag - ward-04
11. Kandapara - ward-04
12. Depara - ward-05
13. Ataikathi - ward-06
14. Parnawapara - ward-06
15. Nawapara - ward-07
16. Patilakhali - ward-08
17. Betkhali - ward-08
18. Nataikhali - ward-09
19. Gaborkhali - ward-09
20. Gaokhali - ward-09
