= Satgambuj Union =

Satgambuj Union ষাটগুম্বজ ইউনিয়ন
- Union
- Satgambuj Union
- Country: Bangladesh
- Division: Khulna
- District: Bagerhat
- Upazila: Bagerhat Sadar
- Established: 1961

Area
  - Total: 91.71 km^{2} (35.41 sq mi)

Population (2011)
  - Total: 15,077
  - Density: 164.4/km^{2} (425.8/sq mi)
- Time zone: UTC+6 (BST)
- Website: shaitgombojup.bagerhat.gov.bd

Satgambuj Union (Bengali: ষাটগুম্বজ ইউনিয়ন) is a Union Parishad under Bagerhat Sadar Upazila of Bagerhat District in Khulna Division, Bangladesh. It has an area of 91.71 km2 (35.41 sq mi) and a population of 15,077.
