= Bidhubhushan Basu =

Bidhubhushan Basu (1875–1972) was an Indian social worker, writer, and journalist working primarily in Bengali.

== Early life ==
Basu was born on 27 May 1875 in Kanthal, Bagerhat District, Khulna,Bengal Presidency, British India. He was raised by relatives after the death of his parents.

== Career ==
Basu taught at Shivpur School, Calcutta where his students included Suniti Kumar Chatterji and Sushil Kumar De. His writings were published in the Sakha O Sathi magazine. He served as the editor of the Sanjibani and Pallichitra magazines. He was involved with the Swadeshi movement and wrote a number of nationalistic plays such as Dada in 1922 and Brahmacharini in 1925. Two of his plays, Mirkashim and Raktayajna, were banned by the British Colonial government. He was arrested and imprisoned for four years for his story "Shikar". He was imprisoned again for taking part in nationalist movements in India in 1930. He was sued for his poem "Vote Ranga" by a zamindar. He founded schools and the local post office in his hometown. He also funded the construction of ponds. He lost his eyesight in his old age.

== Bibliography ==
- Laksmi Meye (1897)
- Laksmi Ma (1898)
- Laksmi Bau (1898)
- Sati Laksmi (1899)
- Charuchandra (1900)
- Amrte Garal, Subhadra (1912)
- Papistha (1914)
- Kamini-Kanchan (1925)
- Dipalir Baji (1926)
- Godhan, Prakhara (1928)
- Kuler Kali (1928)
- Nastoddhar, Biser Batas (1928)
- Jyathai Ma (1928)
- Pautranta (1958)
- Parinam (1961)
- Banomala (1914)

== Death ==
Basu died on 31 January 1972.
