= Khan Jahan Ali Airport =

Planned airport in Bagerhat, Bangladesh

Coordinates: 22.647°N 89.644°E

Khan Jahan Ali Airport, Khulna Khulna Airport
- IATA: none; ICAO: none

Summary
- Airport type: Planned
- Owner: Civil Aviation Authority of Bangladesh
- Operator: Civil Aviation Authority of Bangladesh
- Serves: Khulna
- Location: Khulna-Mongla Highway, Foyla, Rampal, Bagerhat
- Time zone: Bangladesh Standard Time (+6)
- Interactive map of Khan Jahan Ali Airport, Khulna

Runways
Direction	Length		Surface
Direction	ft	m	Surface
	4,922	1,500	Grass

Khan Jahan Ali Airport is a planned airport in Bagerhat, Bangladesh. As it is very close to Khulna, it was planned to mainly serve the Khulna city. It is uncertain if the project will be completed as no work has been done since the beginning of the project in 1996, when, following the acquisition of the land and filling of the earth, funds ran out. The as-of-yet incomplete airfield will consist of a small terminal, two connecting taxiways and a north–south oriented runway with turntables at either ends so aircraft can backtrack down it.

== Development ==
In 2018, it was reported that the airport project had been shifted to a public-private partnership (PPP) arrangement and the revised budget for the airport had been reduced from ৳545 crore (US$44 million) to ৳217 crore (US$18 million). The construction deadline has also been extended to June 2020.

== See also ==
- List of airports in Bangladesh
