= Jahan Khan (town) =

Town in Shikarpur, Pakistan

- Town
- Location in Sindh, Pakistan Jahan Khan (Pakistan)
- Coordinates: 27.959°N 68.638°E
- Country: Pakistan
- Province: Sindh
- Division: Larkana
- District: Shikarpur
- Elevation: 50 m (160 ft)

Population
  - Total: 4,000
- Time zone: UTC+5 (PKT)
- Calling code: 0726

Jahan Khan (Sindhi: جهان خان) is a union council and a town in Taluka (sub-division) Lakhi Ghulam Shah, Shikarpur District in the province of Sindh. It is directly connected with a grand avenue Sukkur-Jacobabad Highway. The town is 12 km far from Sukkur to the north-western side on the way to Shikarpur. The population is 4000 according to the national census 2017.

== Education ==
Education opportunities are given to the local Students as well as for remote villages with 2 boys schools and one girls' school.
