= Khan Jahan Ali's Tank =

Man-made body of water

Coordinates: 22.6583°N 89.7584°E

Khan Jahan Ali's Tank is a lake-like tank in front of Khan Jahan Ali's tomb Complex in Bagerhat District, Bangladesh.

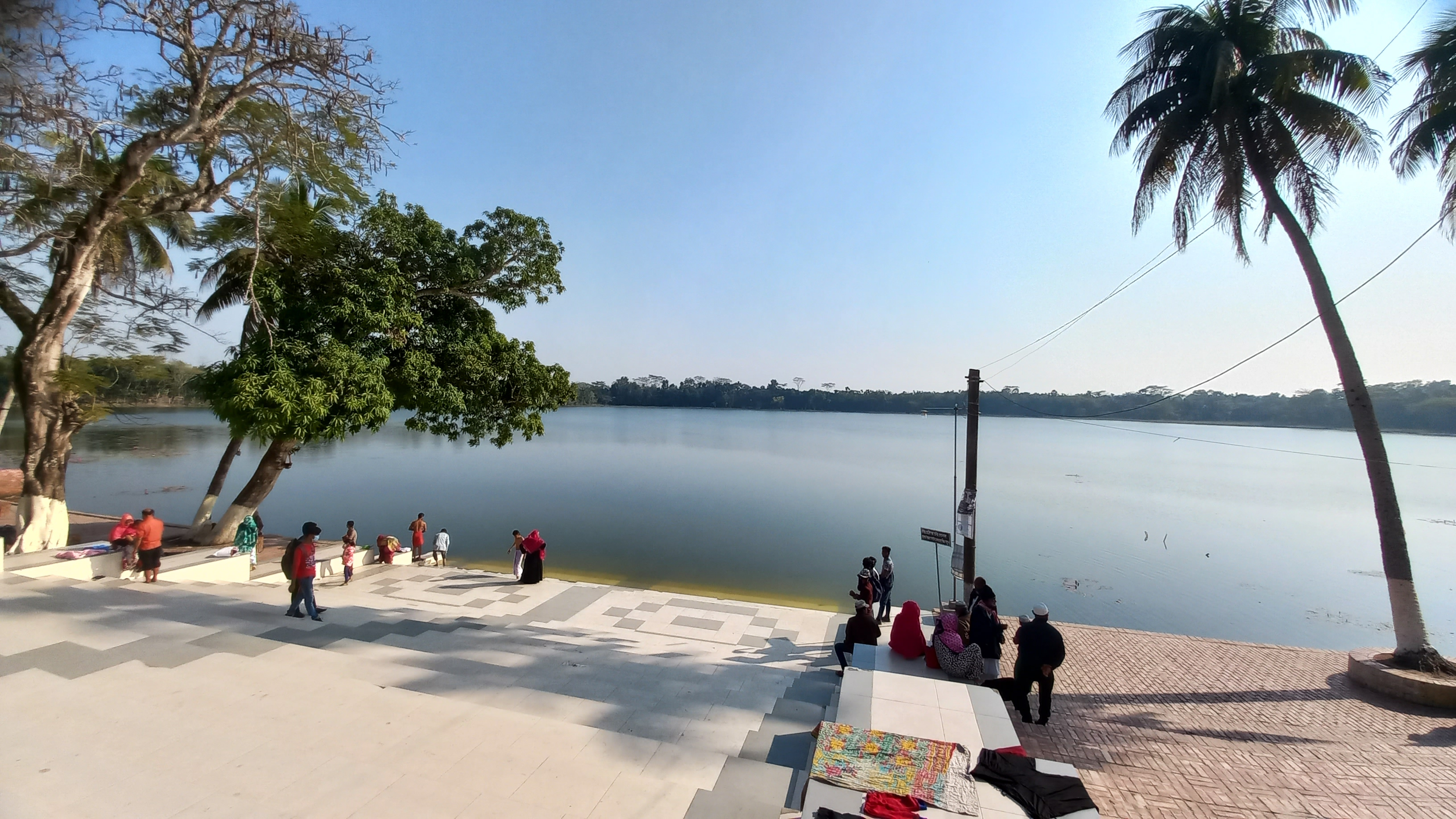
Khan Jahan Ali's Tank in front of the tomb of Khan Jahan Ali

The tank has several crocodiles in it. The species of those are marsh crocodile. People believe that if they appease the hunger of these crocodiles with chicken or goats, they would have the desire of their heart fulfilled. Whenever anybody makes such an offering, the caretaker of the tomb complex, or mazar, calls out the crocodiles, shouting 'Kalapahar, Dhalapahar, come!'. Within a few minutes the crocodiles make their appearance and swallow the offerings.

Only three individuals of marsh crocodile, a male and a female are in a semi-captive condition at Khan Jahan Ali shrine pond or tank at Bagerhat.
