= Bagerhat Sadar Upazila =

Bagerhat বাগেরহাট
- Upazila
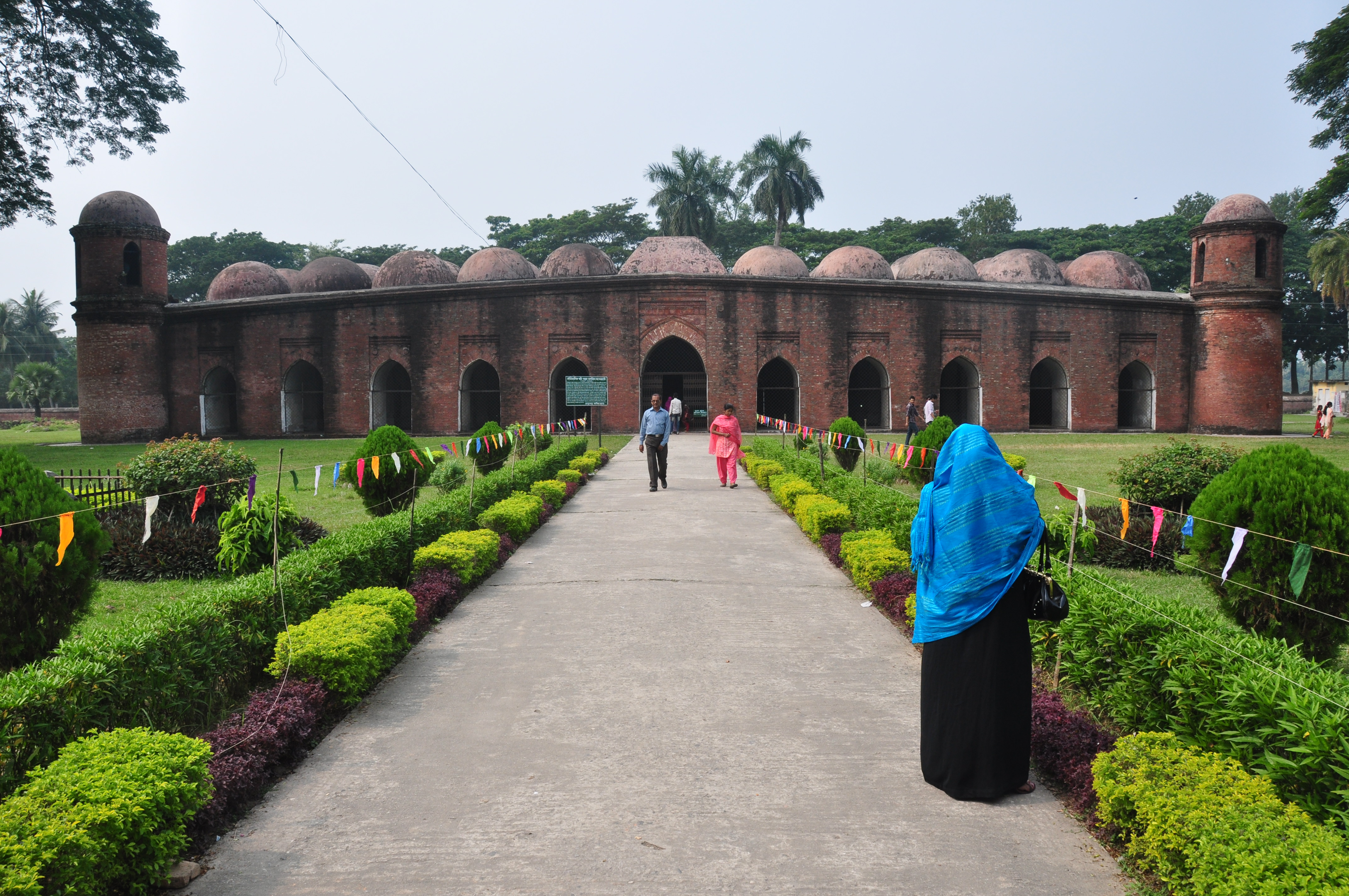
- The Sixty Dome Mosque in Bagerhat

- Coordinates: 22°39.8′N 89°47.5′E
- Country: Bangladesh
- Division: Khulna
- District: Bagerhat
- Headquarters: Bagerhat

Area
  - Total: 272.73 km^{2} (105.30 sq mi)

Population (2022)
  - Total: 288,673
  - Density: 865/km^{2} (2,240/sq mi)
- Time zone: UTC+6 (BST)
- Postal code: 9300
- Website: Official Map of Bagerhat Sadar

Bagerhat Sadar Upazila mauza geocode map

Bagerhat Sadar (Bengali: বাগেরহাট সদর) is an upazila of Bagerhat District in the Division of Khulna, Bangladesh. The municipality was established in 1958. It consists of 9 wards and 31 mahallas.

== History ==
Khan Jahan Ali established a pargana named Khalifatabad here in 1429 AD, which covered Bagerhat, Khulna, Jessore, Satkhira and Barisal. The Sixty Dome Mosque was the central administrative place of the kingdom. He built a mint, several mosques, and excavated several lakes.

During the Bangladesh Liberation War, Razakar Seraj Master killed 18 members of a family in the area. Battles between the Pakistan army and the Bangladeshi Freedom Fighters, the Mukti Bahini, were held at Panighat, Devir Bazar and Madhav Kathi.

== Geography ==
Bagerhat Sadar has 64,022 households and a total area of 272.73 km^{2}. Bagerhat Sadar Upazila is bounded by Fakirhat and Chitalmari upazilas on the north, Morrelganj upazila on the south, Kachua upazila on the east, Rampal and Fakirhat upazila on the west. The main rivers in the area are the Bhairab, Chitra, Daudkhali, Poylahar, and the Putimari.

== Demographics ==
Religions in Bagerhat Sadar Upazila (2022)
Religion	Percent
Islam	84.30%
Hinduism	15.53%
Other or not stated	0.17%

According to the 2022 Bangladeshi census, Bagerhat Sadar Upazila had 73,176 households and a population of 288,673. 8.14% were under 5 years of age. Bagerhat Sadar had a literacy rate of 82.60%: 83.71% for males and 81.52% for females, and a sex ratio of 99.25 males per 100 females. 64,043 (22.18%) lived in urban areas.

As of the 2011 Census of Bangladesh, Bagerhat Sadar upazila had 64,022 households and a population of 266,389. 49,111 (18.44%) were under 10 years of age. Bagerhat Sadar had an average literacy rate of 63.58%, compared to the national average of 51.8%, and a sex ratio of 993 females per 1000 males. 49,073 (18.42%) of the population lived in urban areas.

As of the 1991 Bangladesh census, Bagerhat Sadar had a population of 235,848. The upazila had an average literacy rate of 49.9% (7+ years), compared to the Bangladeshi national average of 32.4%.

== Economy ==
=== Health organization ===
In Bagerhat Sadar, there is a 250-bed government hospital, 2 satellite clinics, 10 union health and family planning centers, 1 maternity clinic, 7 private clinics, and 2 nursing training schools.

=== Main crops ===
Paddy, wheat, jute, potato, banana and papaya, garlic, and onion are the main crops of Bagerhat Sadar.

=== Industry ===
In Bagerhat Sadar upazila, there are 28 spice grinding mills, 22 flour mills, 25 rice mills, and 28 coconut oil mills. Cottage industries include 70 goldsmiths, 40 blacksmiths, 60 welders, 1 honey cultivation project, and 1 bidi factory.

== Arts and culture ==
The Mosque City of Bagerhat, a UNESCO-registered complex of Muslim architecture, is in the suburbs of Bagerhat city. Apart from the mosque recently Khan Jahan Ali's home has been dug out. Concerning modern culture, there are 4 public libraries, 1 museum, 2 cinemas, 25 rural clubs, 1 women's organization, and 1 playground in Bagerhat Sadar Upazila. You can explore the UNESCO property in the Google Arts and Culture Platform Bagerhat on Google Arts and Culture

== Administration ==
Bagerhat Thana was formed in 1842 and it was turned into an upazila in 1983.

Bagerhat Sadar Upazila is divided into Bagerhat Municipality and ten union parishads:

1. Baraipara Union Parishad,

2. Bemarta Union Parishad,

3. Bishnupur Union Parishad,

4. Dema Union Parishad,

5. Gotapara Union Parishad,

6. Jatrapur Union Parishad,

7. Karapara Union Parishad,

8. Khanpur Union Parishad,

9. Rakhalgachhi Union Parishad, and

10. Shat Gambuj Union Parishad.

The union parishads are subdivided into 185 mauzas and 187 villages.

Bagerhat Municipality is subdivided into 9 wards and 31 mahallas.

The current UP chairman is Sardar Nasir who was this post for the 1st consecutive time in January 2018.

== Notable residents ==
- Bidhubhushan Basu, social worker and writer, was born in Kanthal village in 1875.

== See also ==
- Upazilas of Bangladesh
- Districts of Bangladesh
- Divisions of Bangladesh
