= Architecture of Bangladesh =

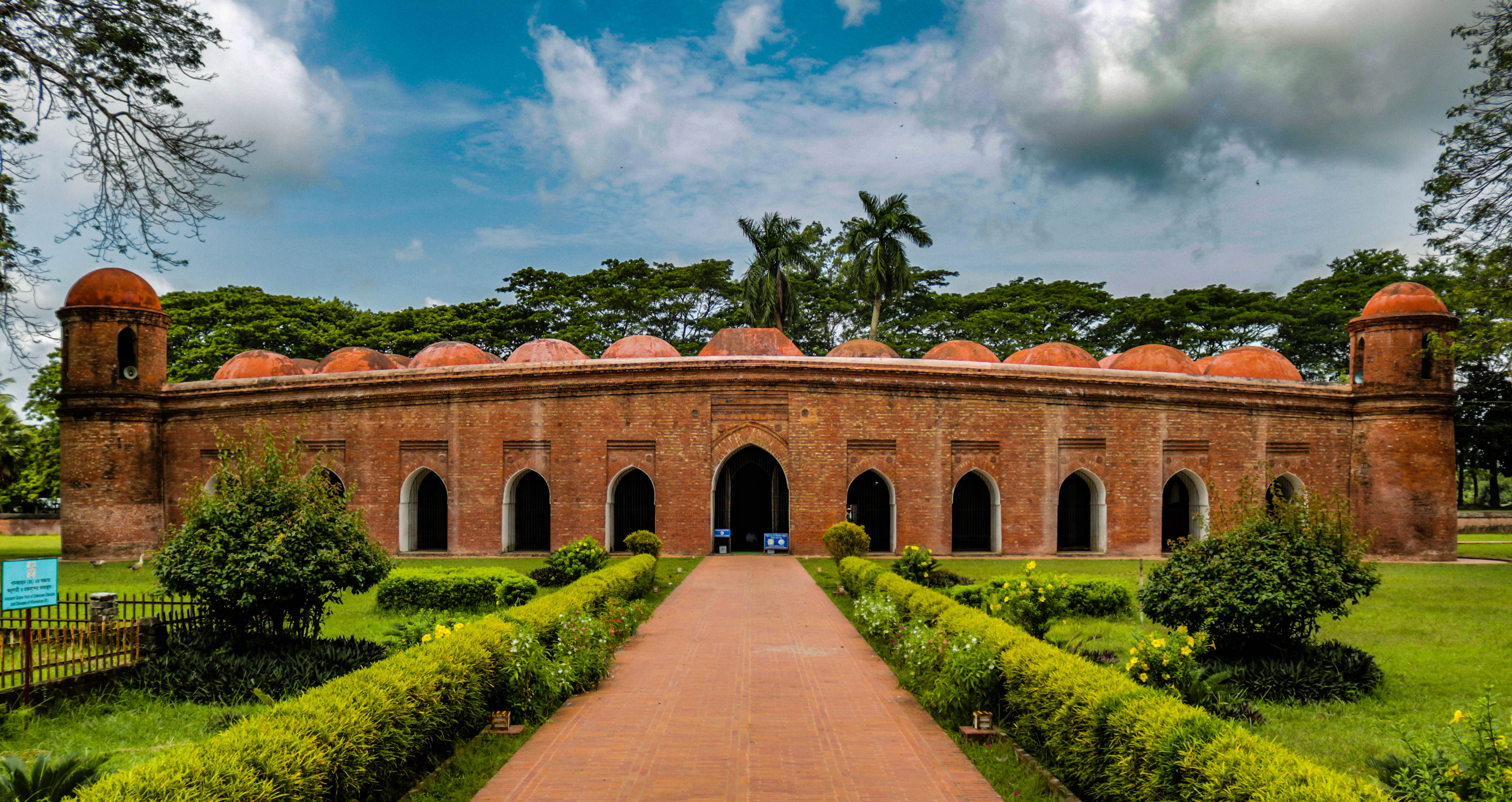
The Tughlaq styled Sixty Dome Mosque is in the UNESCO World Heritage Site of Bagerhat

The architecture of Bangladesh is intertwined with the architecture of the Bengal region and the broader Indian subcontinent. The architecture of Bangladesh has a long history and is rooted in Bangladesh's culture, religion and history. It has evolved over centuries and assimilated influences from social, religious and exotic communities. The architecture of Bangladesh bears a remarkable impact on the lifestyle, tradition and cultural life of Bangladeshi people. Bangladesh has many architectural relics and monuments dating back thousands of years.

== Pala Buddhist architecture ==
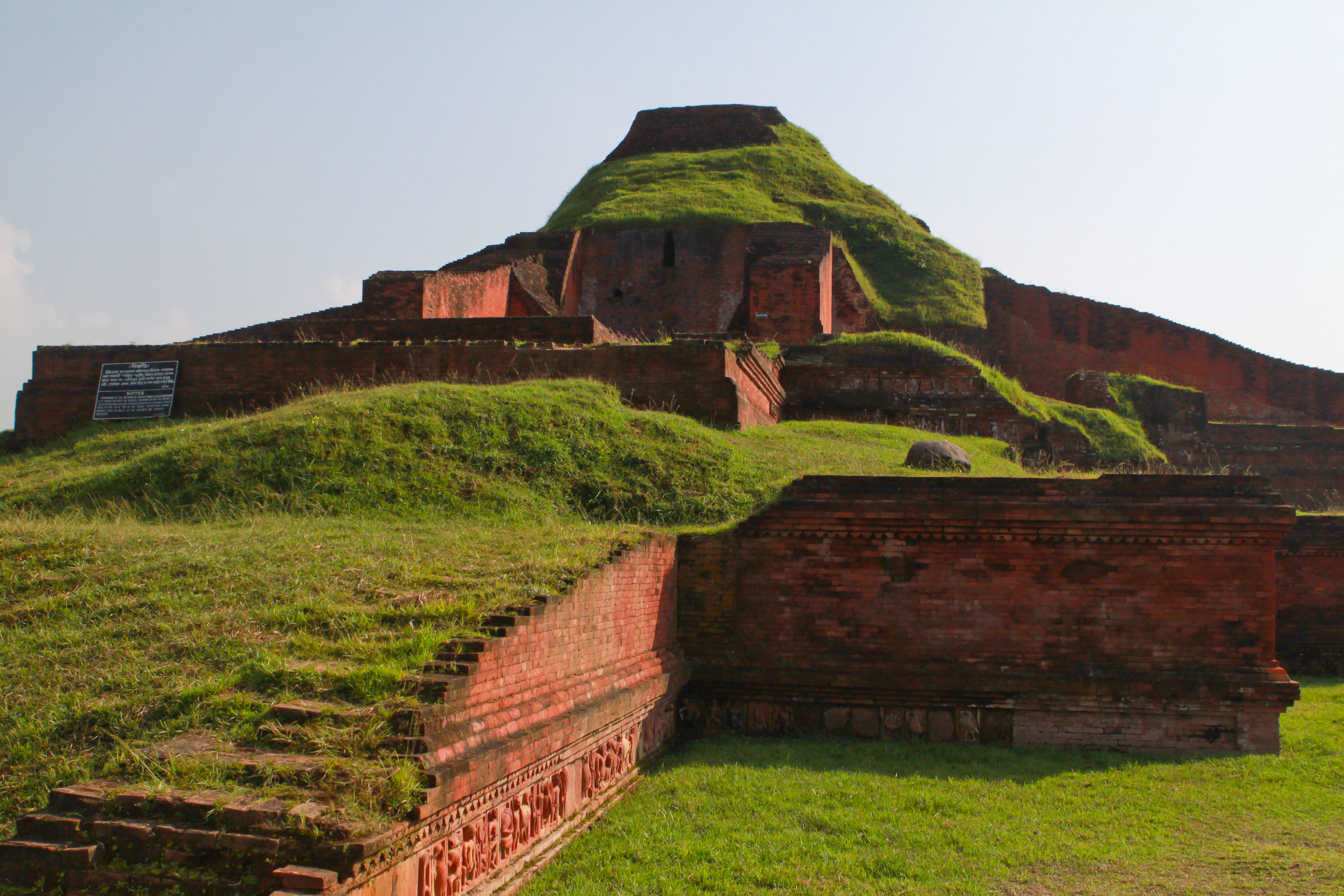
Structures in Somapura Mahavihara complex

The Pala Empire was an early Indian empire of Bengali Buddhist dynasty ruling from Bengal (which included present-day Bangladesh) from the 8th to the 12th centuries. The Palas created a distinctive form of Bengali architecture and art known as the "Pala School of Sculptural Art." The central shrine of the Paharpur vihara was the mature form of a cruciform Buddhist shrine and Śikhara-śirsha-bhadra type. The gigantic structures of Vikramashila Vihar, Odantpuri Vihar, and Jagaddal Vihar were masterpieces of the Palas. These mammoth structures were destroyed by the forces of the infamous Bakhtiar Khilji. The Somapura Mahavihara, a creation of Dharmapala, at Paharpur, Bangladesh, is the largest Buddhist Vihara in the Indian subcontinent and has been described as a "pleasure to the eyes of the world." UNESCO made it a World Heritage Site in 1985. The Pala architectural style was followed throughout south-eastern Asia and China, Japan, and Tibet. Bengal rightfully earned the name "Mistress of the East". Dr. Stella Kramrisch says: "The art of Bihar and Bengal exercised a lasting influence on that of Nepal, Burma, Ceylon and Java." Dhiman and Vittpala were two celebrated Pala sculptors. About Somapura Mahavihara, Mr J.C. French says with grief: "For the research of the Pyramids of Egypt we spend millions of dollars every year. But had we spent only one per cent of that money for the excavation of Somapura Mahavihara, who knows what extraordinary discoveries could have been made".

== Indo-Islamic architecture ==
The Sultanate of Bengal was an era of the Central Asian origin Muslim Nawab dynasty that ruled independently of the Mughal Empire from 1342 to 1576. Most of the Muslim architecture of the period is found in the historic Gaur region, today's Rajshahi Division and Malda district in West Bengal. The architecture of the period is noted for the development of a uniquely local style influenced by Bengali architectural traditions. Sonargaon was also a Sultanate capital (capital of the Baro-Bhuyan Confederacy) before the arrival of the Mughals and Dhaka within the confines of Dholai Khal was their trading outpost Sultanate architecture is exemplified in structures such as the Shat Gombuj Masjid, the Shona Masjid and the Kusumba Masjid.

=== Mughal architecture ===
In 1576, much of Bengal came under the control of the Mughal Empire. At the time, Dhaka emerged as a Mughal military base. The development of townships and housing had resulted in significant growth in population, as the town was proclaimed by Subahdar Islam Khan I as the capital of Subah Bangala in 1608, during this time many mosques and forts had been built. Bara Katra was built between 1644 and 1646 CE to be the official residence of the Mughal prince Shah Shuja, the second son of the emperor Shah Jahan.

Indian Mughal architecture in present-day Bangladesh reached its peak during the reign of Subedar Shaista Khan, He stayed in the old Afghan fort in the area (present old central jail) and encouraged the construction of modern townships and public works in Dhaka, leading to a massive urban and economic expansion. He was a patron of the arts and encouraged the construction of majestic monuments across the province, including mosques, mausoleums and palaces that represented the finest in Mughal architecture. Khan laid the foundation of Lalbagh Fort (also Fort Aurangabad), Chowk Bazaar Mosque, Lalbagh Shahi Mosque, Saat Masjid, Anderkilla Shahi Jame Mosque and Choto Katra. He also supervised the construction of the mausoleum for his daughter Bibi Pari in the fort area.

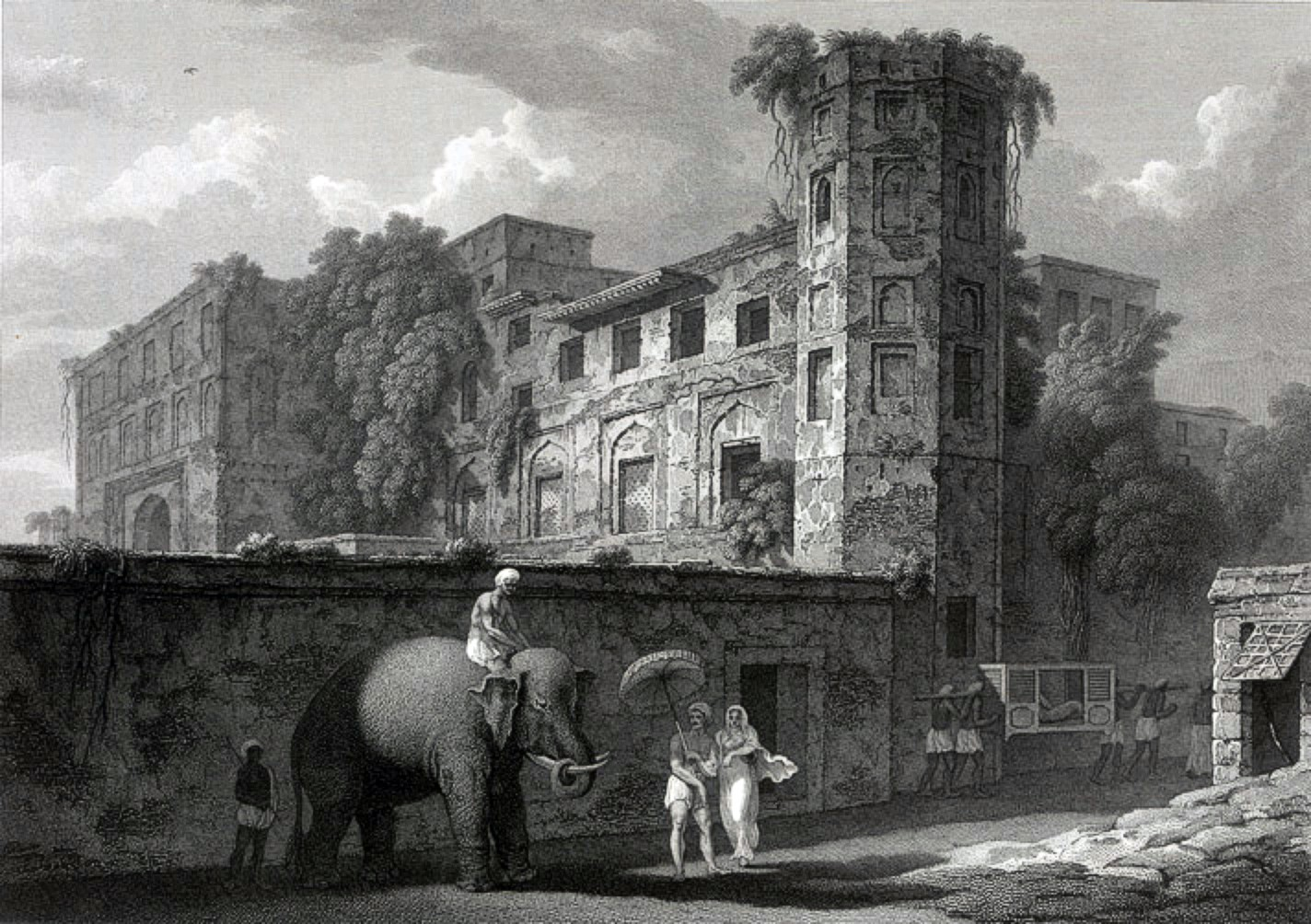
Bara Katra, etching by Sir Charles D'Oyly in 1823

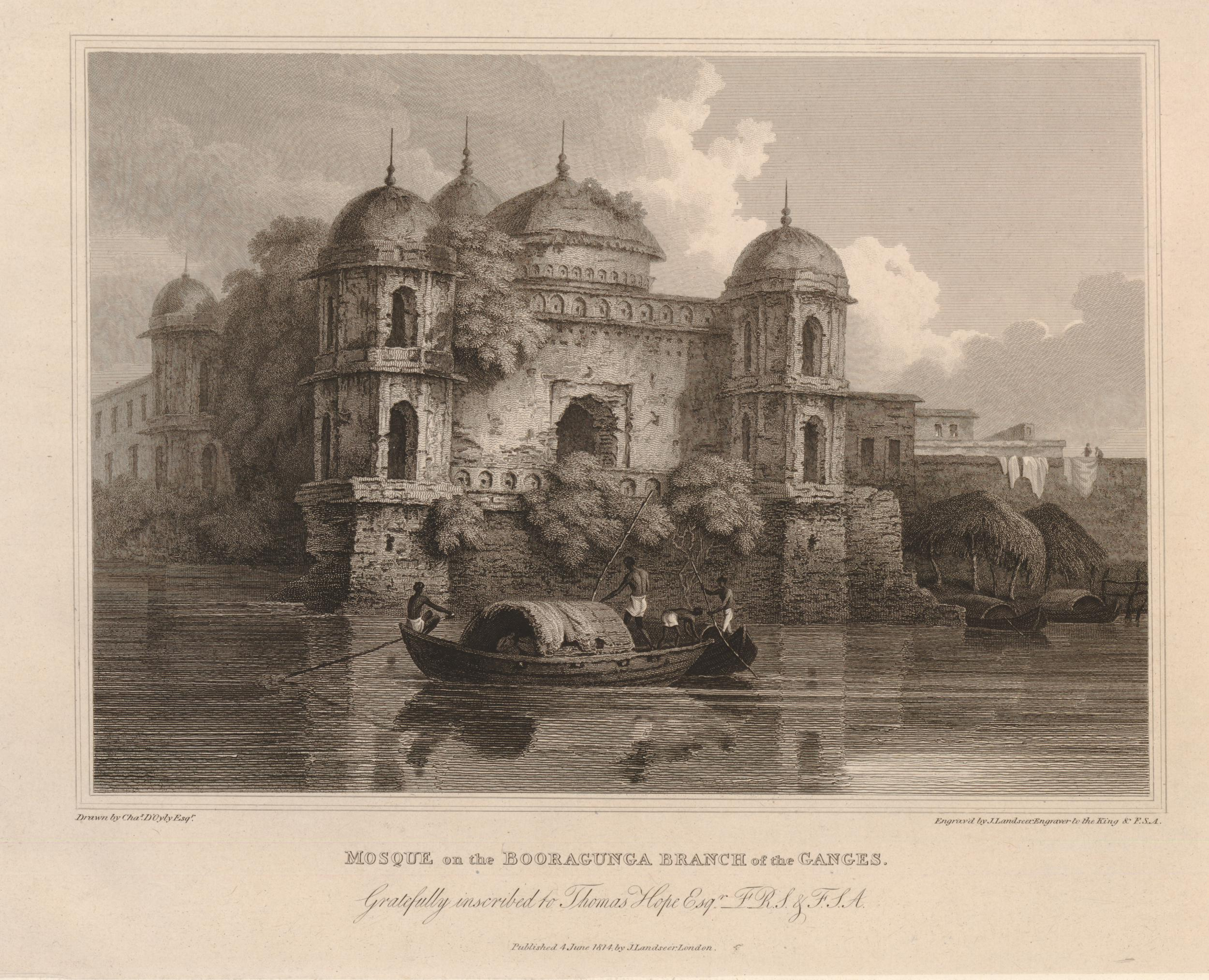
The Saat Masjid on the Buriganga River banks in the 19th century

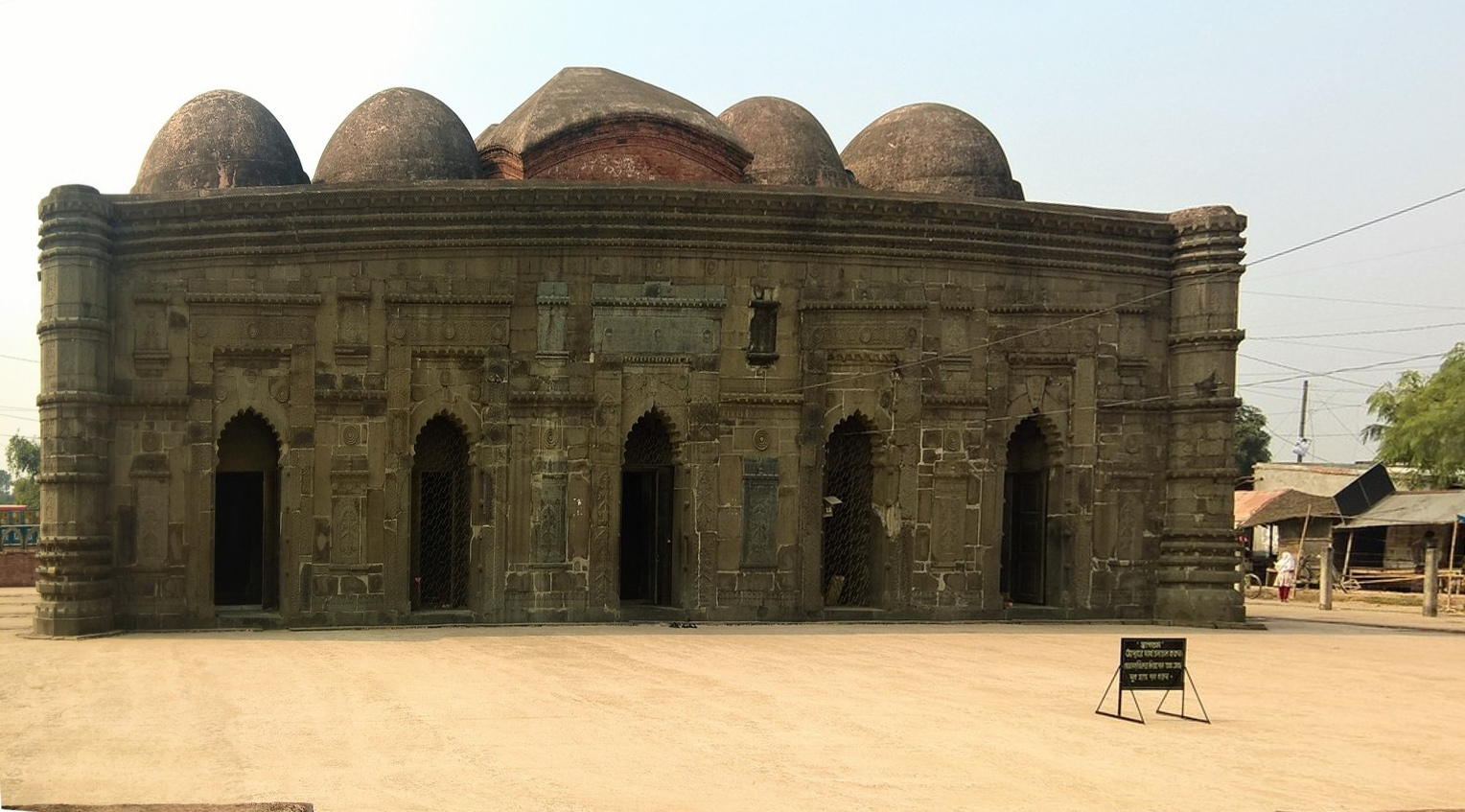
The Chhoto Shona Masjid.

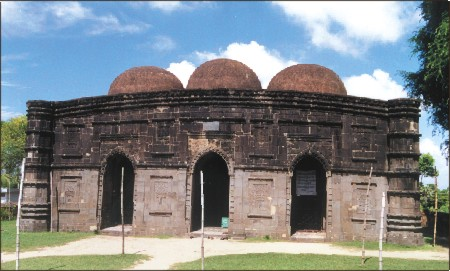
The Kusumba Mosque

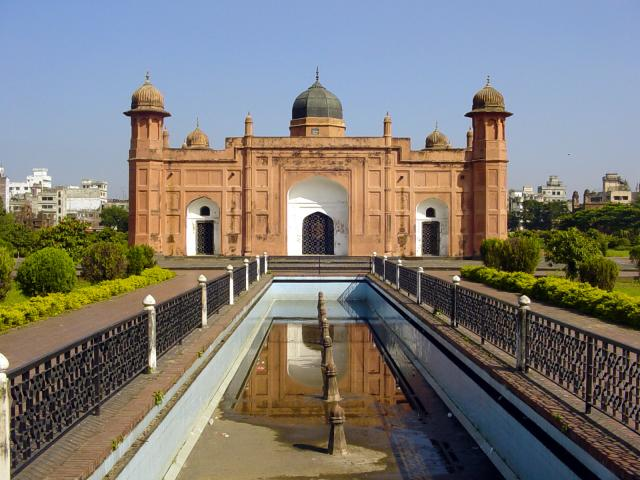
Lalbagh Fort built by Muhammad Azam Shah.

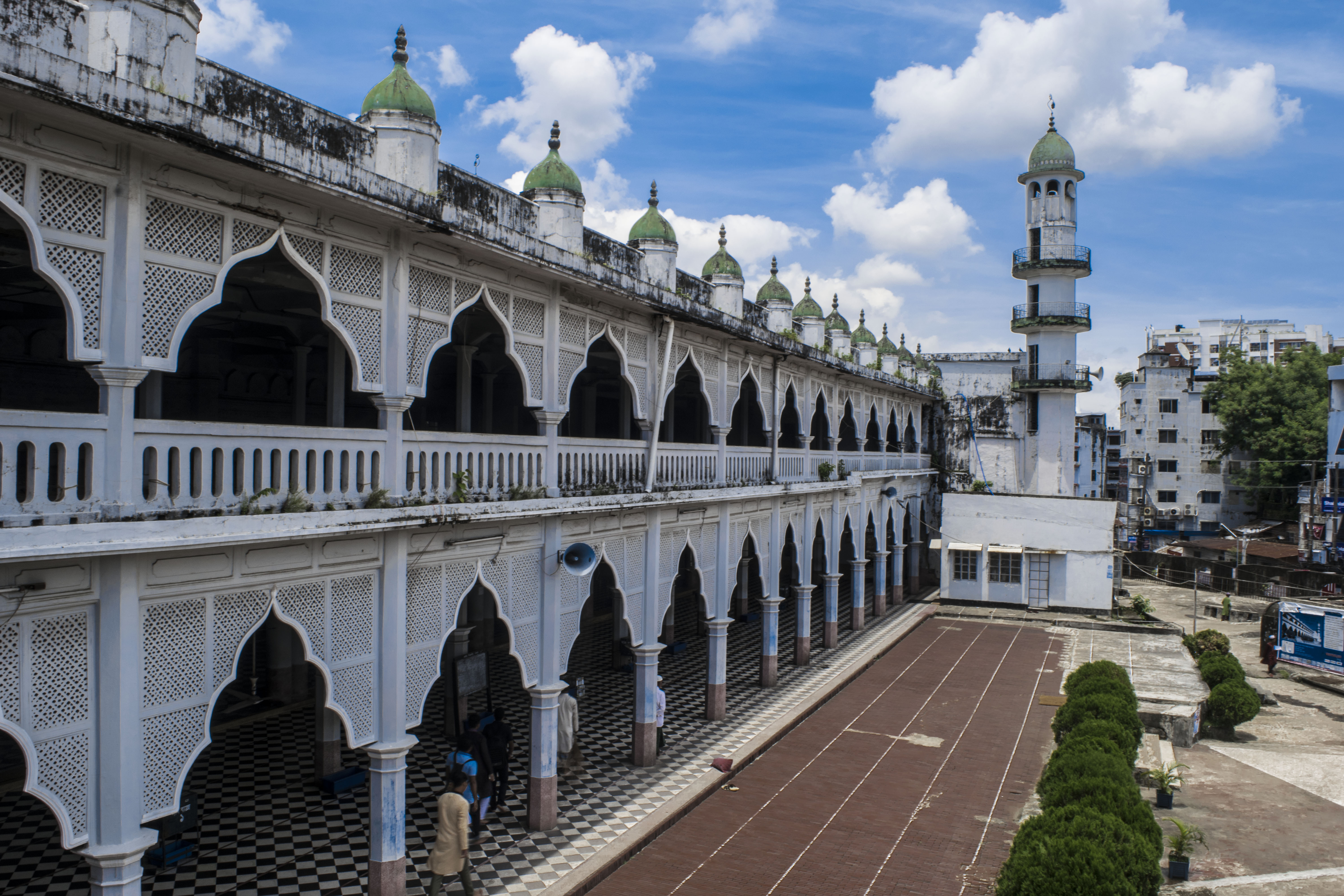
Anderkilla Shahi Jame Mosque

== Terracotta temple architecture ==
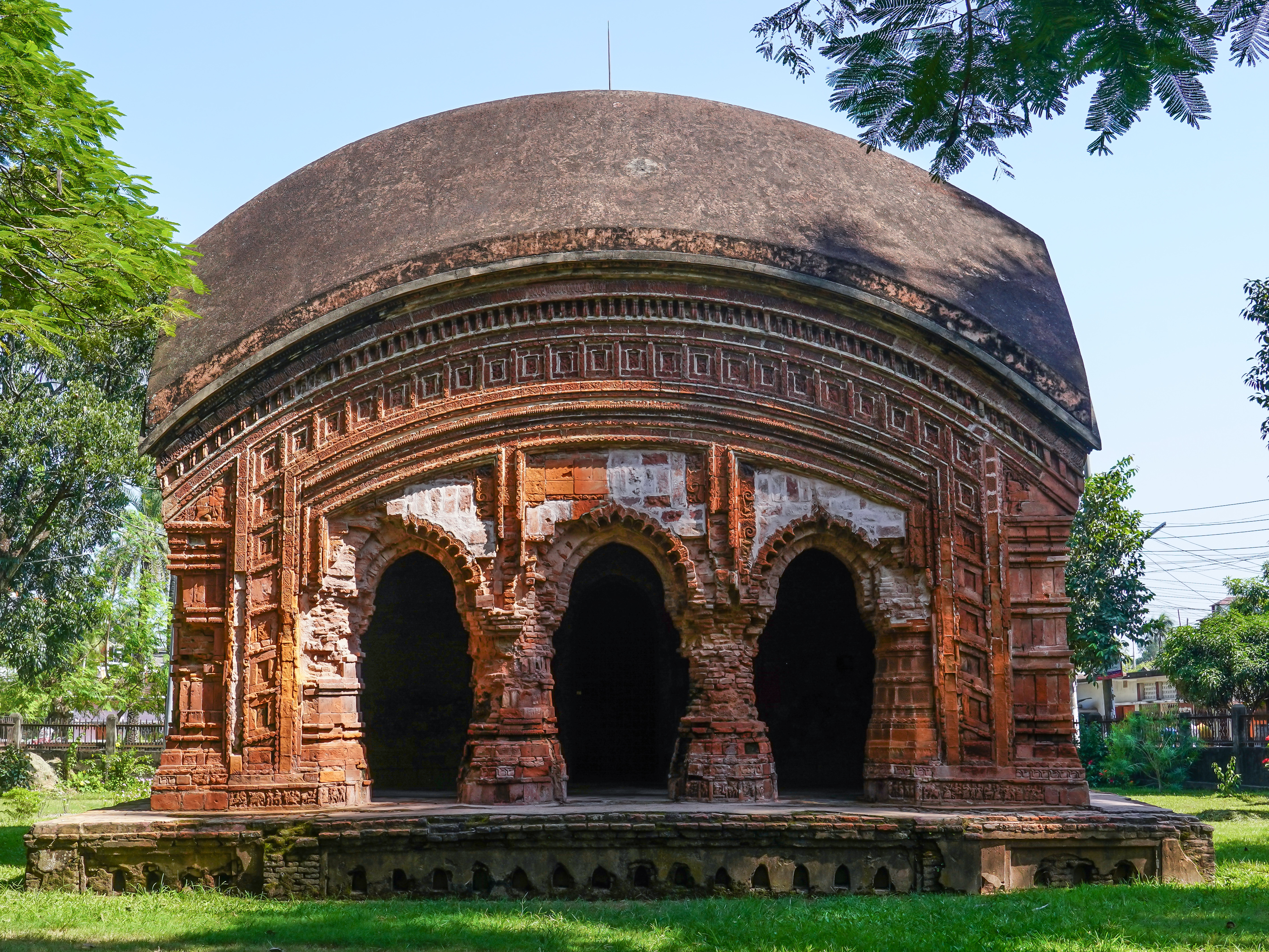
Gopinath Temple, Pabna, with a Do-chala roof

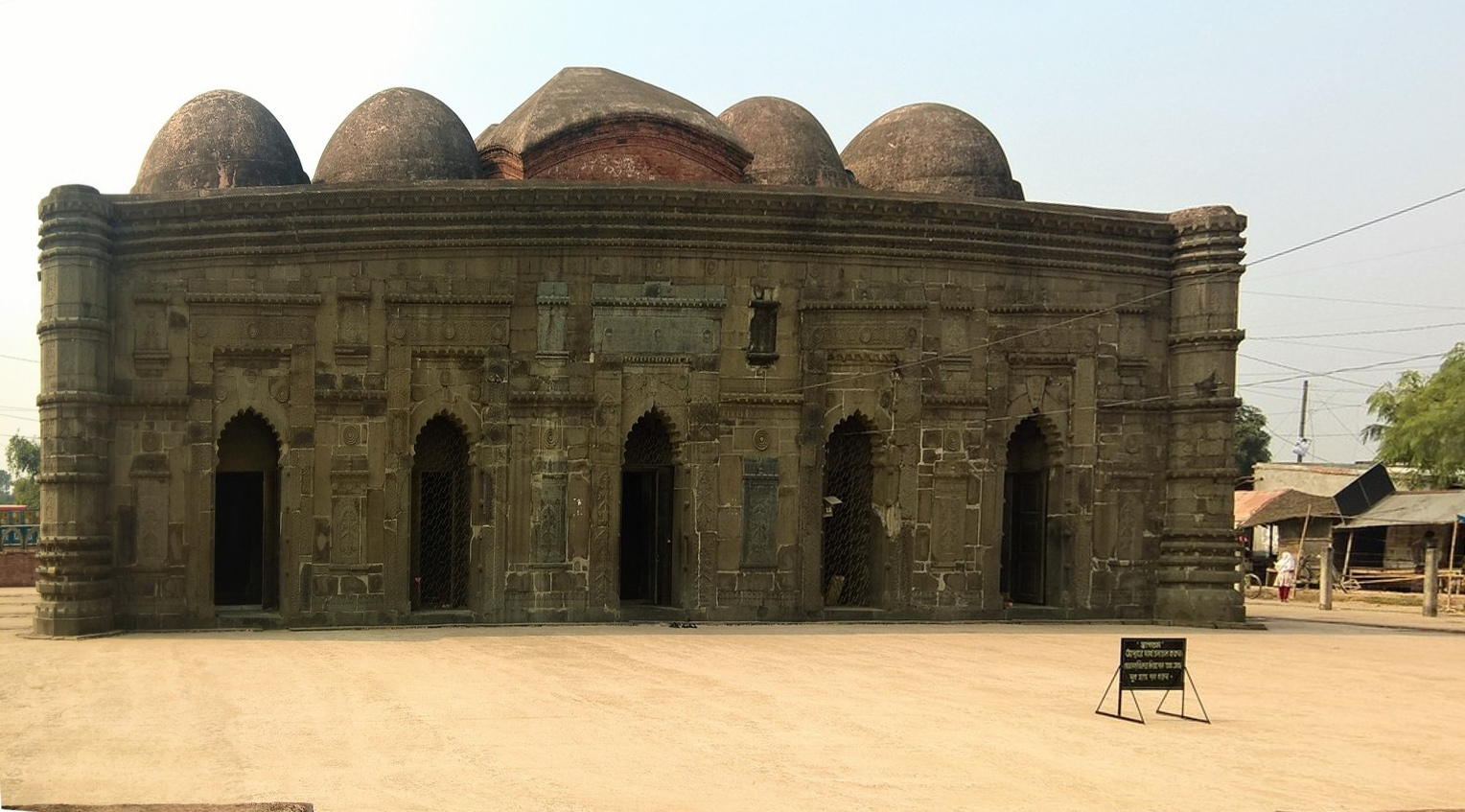
Choto Shona Mosque with the "ek-chala" roof

Much of the terracotta temple architecture in Bangladesh dates to the late Islamic period and early British period during which wealthy Hindu zamindars commissioned these structures. There are several distinctive styles of roof, mostly based on vernacular styles for village houses, the originals mostly using plant materials. Some smaller temples also use thatch, but grander examples imitate the designs in stone. Other temples use versions of Hindu temple architecture found in eastern India.

=== Styles of temple roofs ===
==== Chala Style ====
- ek-bangla, have a curved roof with two sloping sides
- Jor-bangla Style, has a roof of the ek-Bangla (or do-Chala) style, with two curved segments that meet at a curved ridge
- ek-chala, single-story or has a second story built into a sloping roof
- Do-chala, have a curved roof with two sloping sides
- Char-chala, have a curved roof composed of four triangular segments
- At-chala, the base structure is similar to the four-sided char-Chala temple style, but with a small replica of the base temple on top
- Deul, were generally smaller and included features influenced by Islamic architecture

==== Ratna Style ====
- Ek-ratna, the base structure is similar to the four-sided char-Chala temple style, but the roof is quite different, flat with a tower in the centre.
- Pancharatna, has five pavilions or towers on the roof; four stands at the corners of the main level, and one above.
- Navaratna, incorporates two main levels, each with four spired corner pavilions, and a central pavilion above, for a total of nine spires.
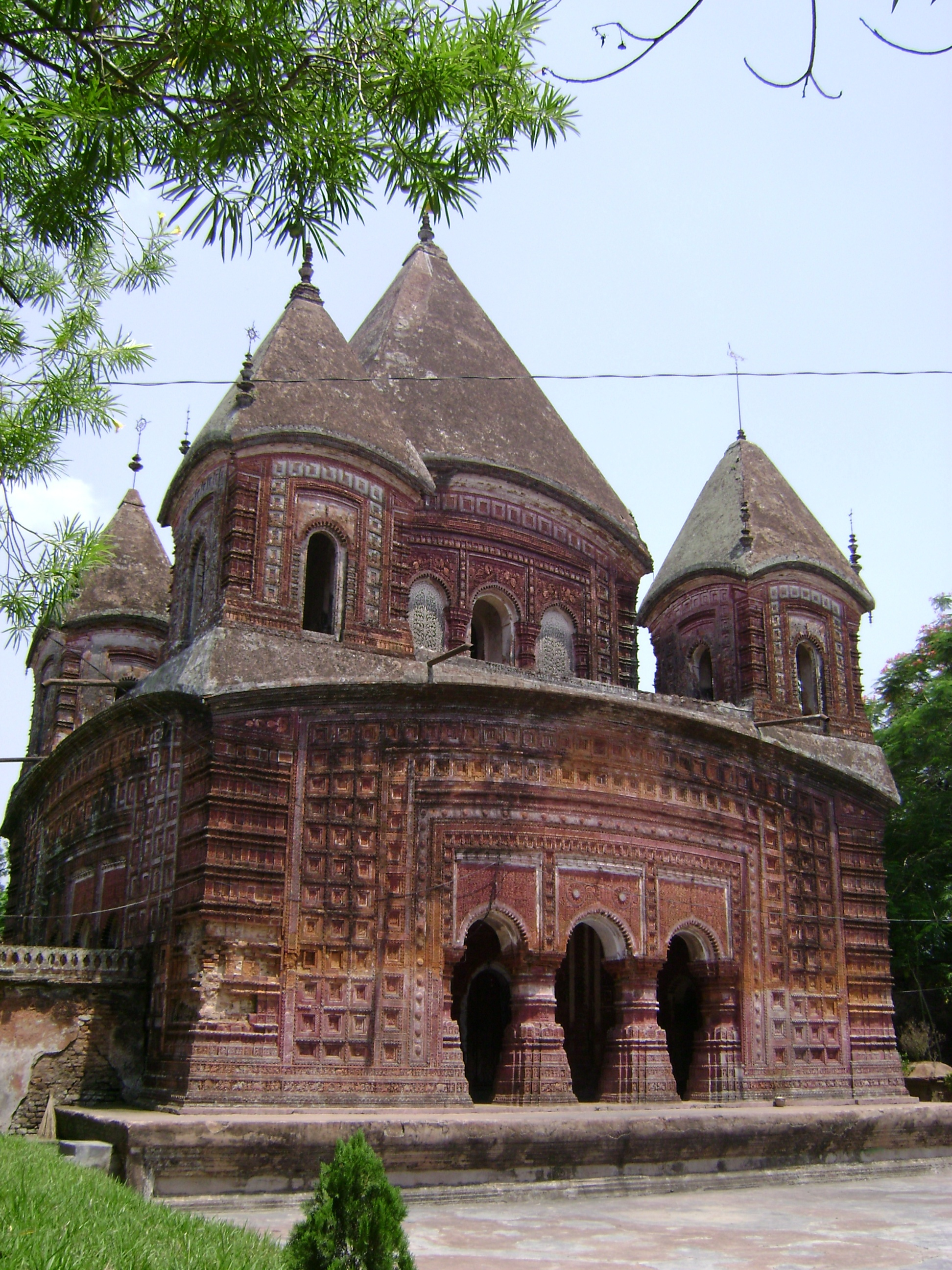
The Pancharatna Gobinda Temple at Puthia Temple Complex, Rajshahi

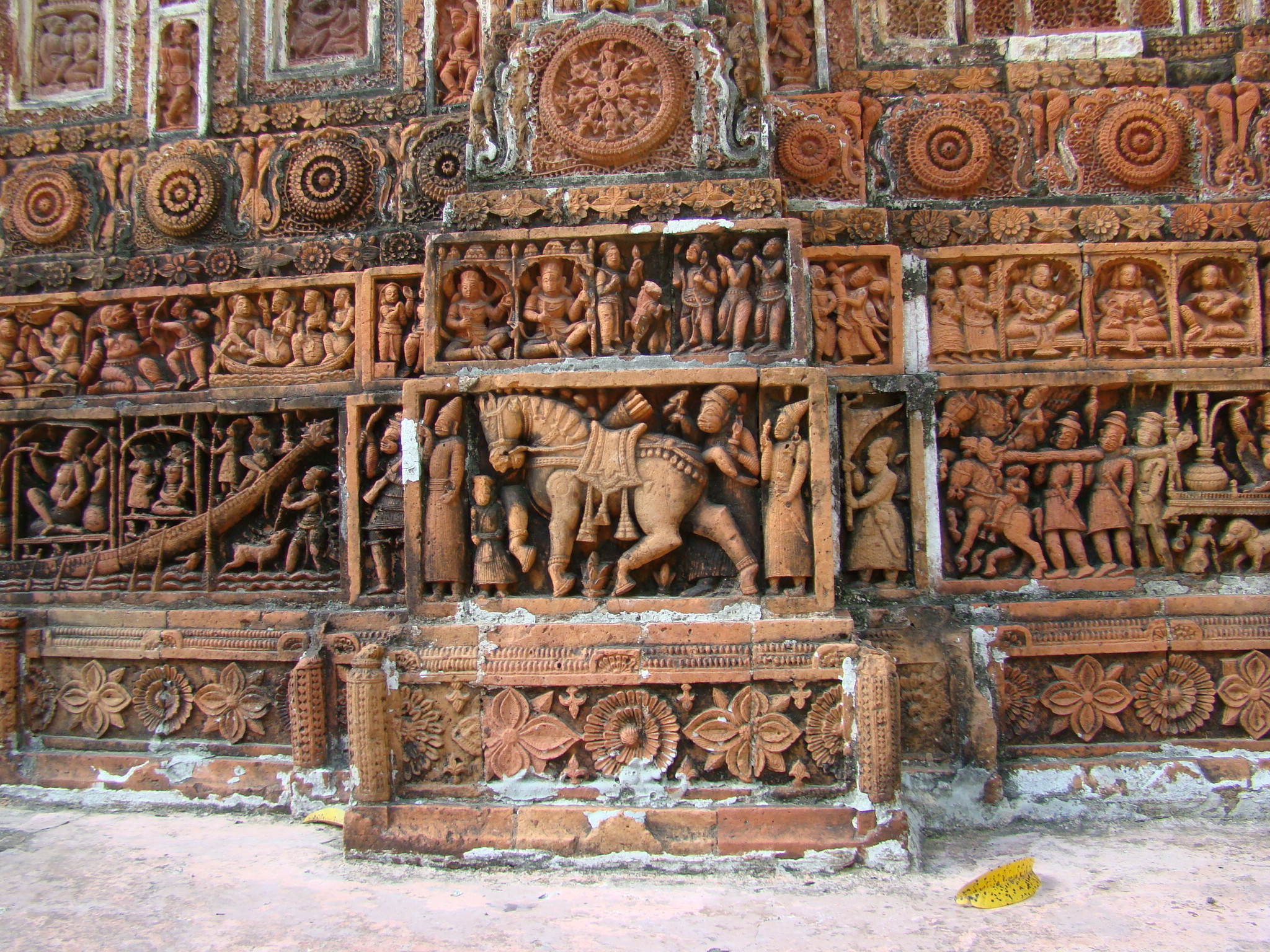
Terracotta designs outside the Kantajew Temple, Dinajpur

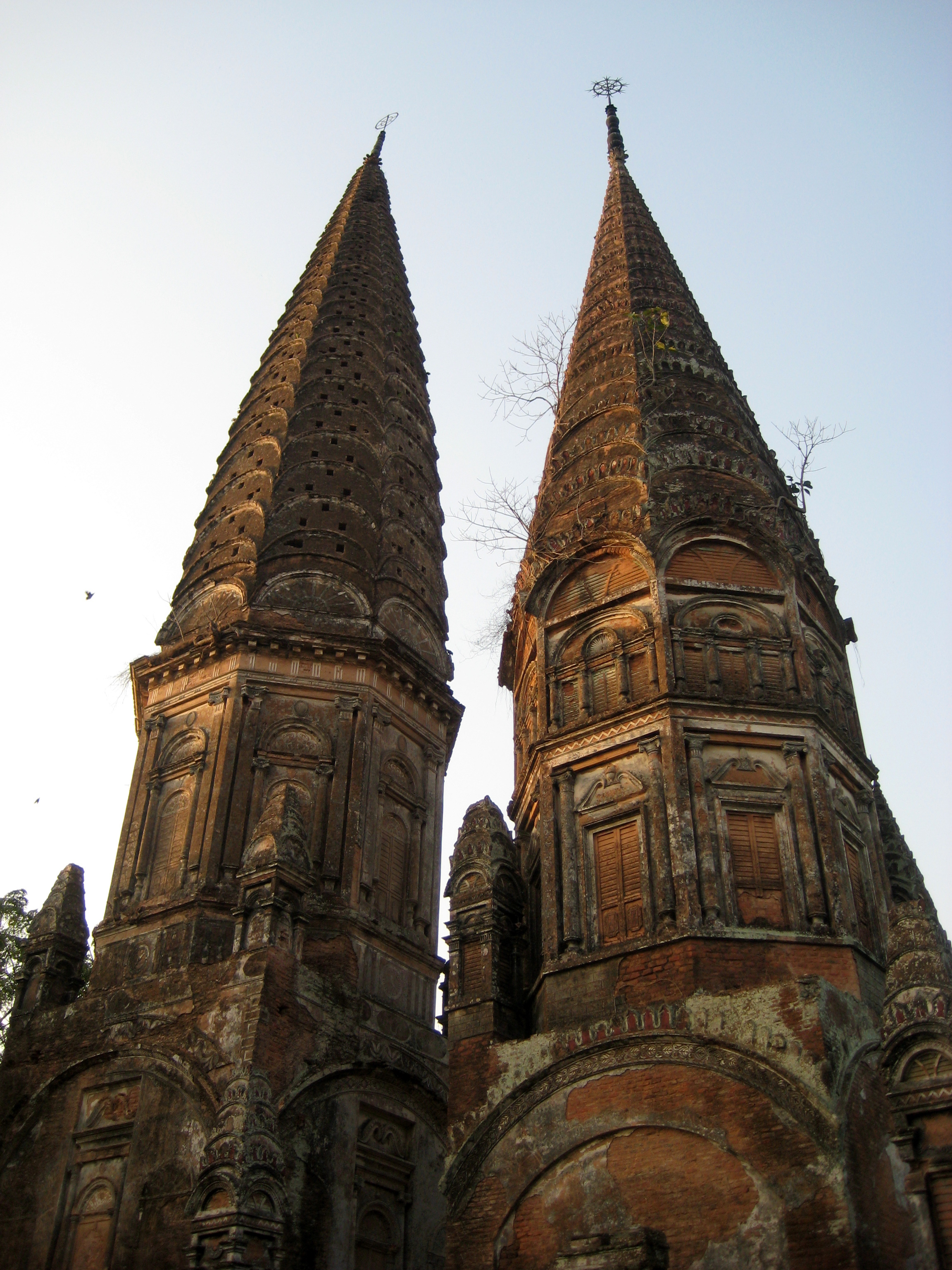
Sonarang Twin Temples Munshiganj

== British Colonial period ==
=== Common bungalow style architecture ===
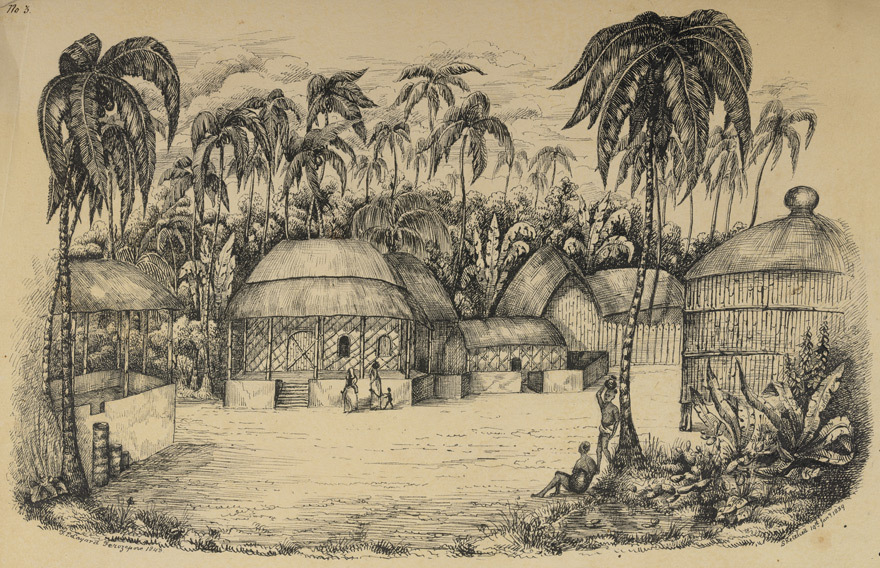
Village in a clearing Sundarbans, by Frederic Peter Layard, January 1839

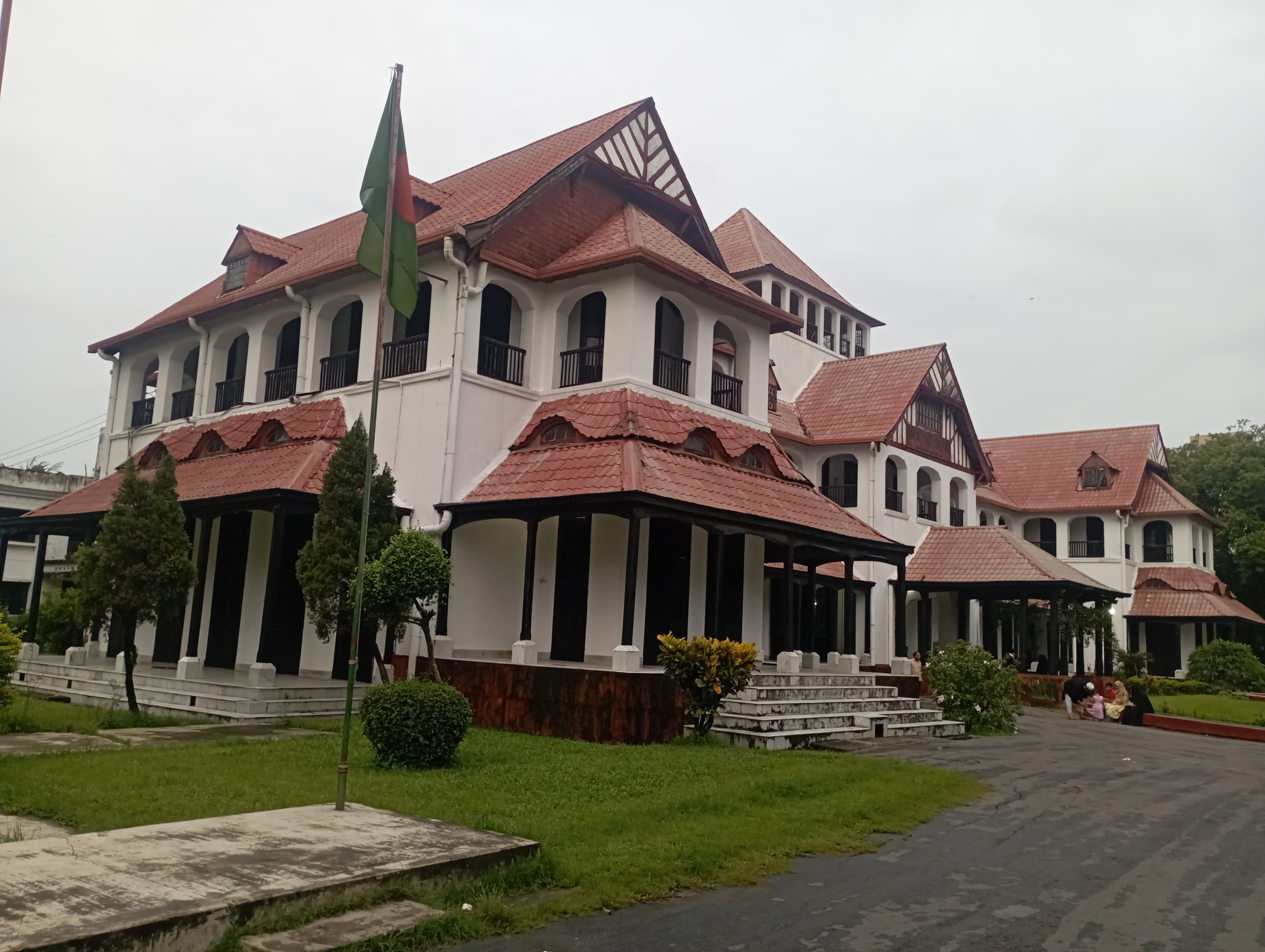
Former Circuits House building in Chittagong, which is now Zia Memorial Museum

The word "bungalow" derives from the Hindi term baṅglā, meaning "belonging to Bengal", and originally meant a type of cottage built for early Europeans there. Such houses were small, usually one storey, and had a wide veranda.

=== Indo-Saracenic Revival architecture ===
In the British colonial age predominantly representative buildings of the Indo-European style developed, from a mixture of mainly Indian, European and Central Asian (Islamic) components. Amongst the more prominent works are Ahsan Manzil in Dhaka and Tajhat Palace in Rangpur City.

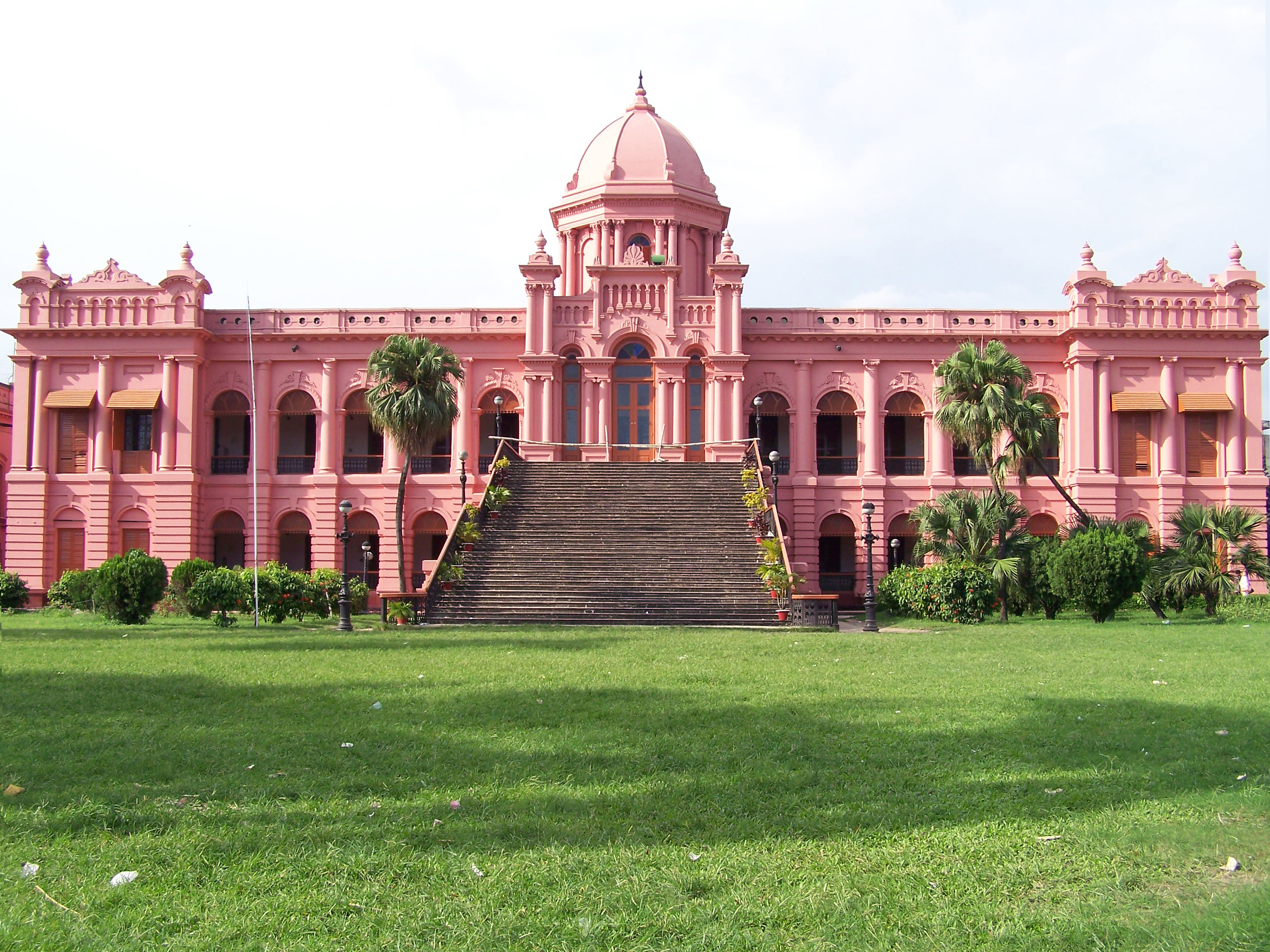
Ahsan Manzil in Dhaka

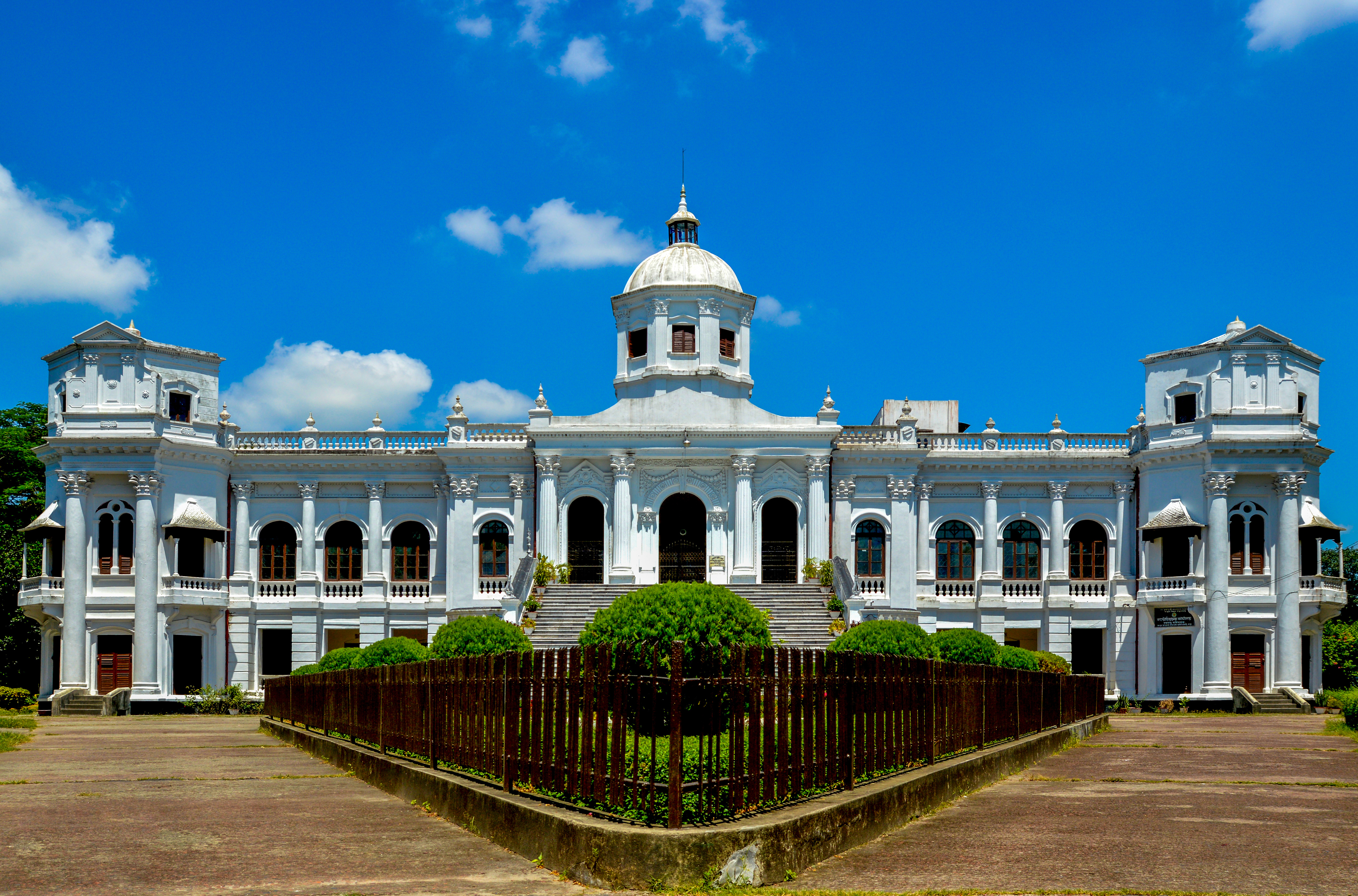
Tajhat Palace in Rangpur

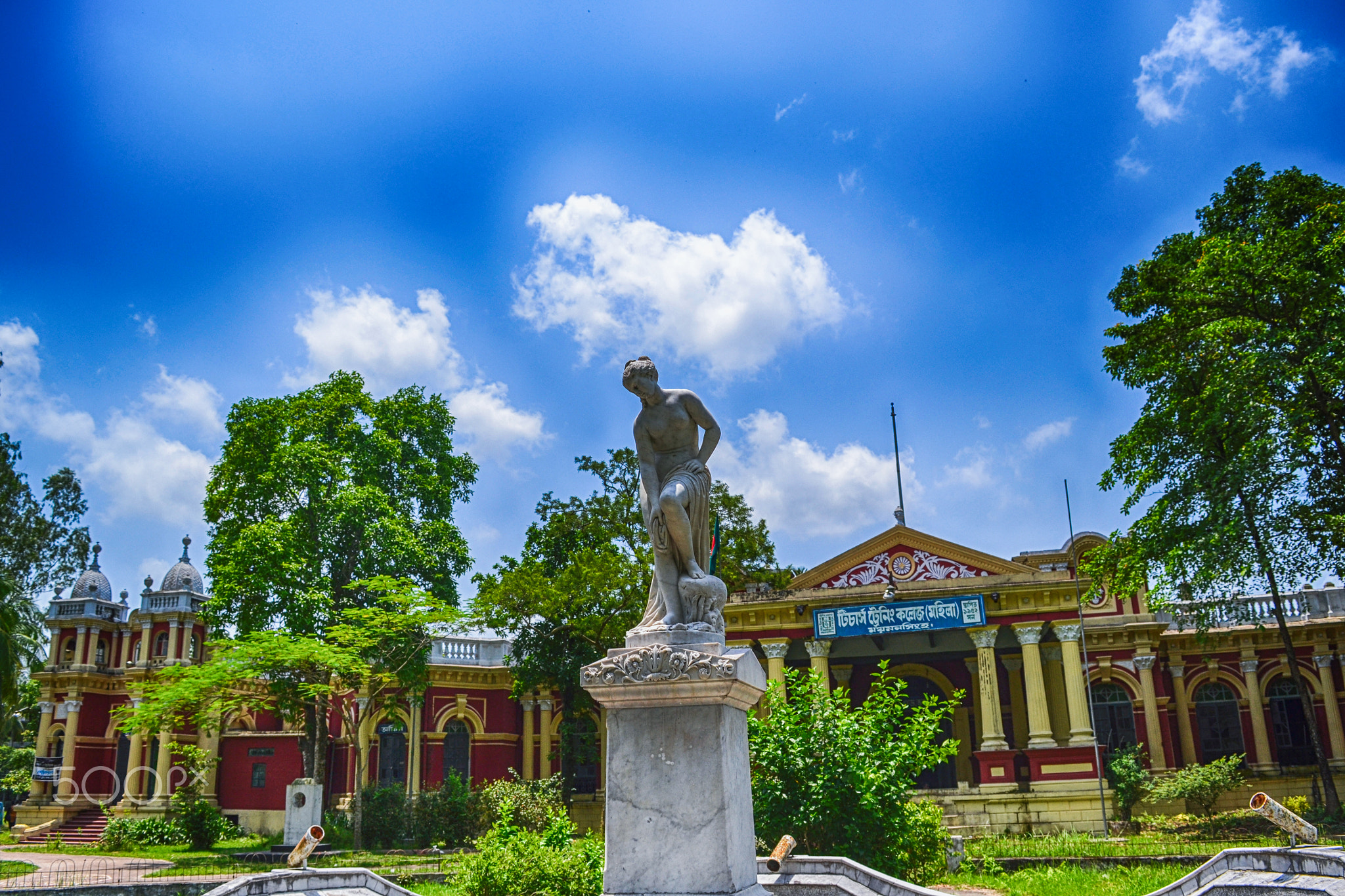
Shashi Lodge in Mymensingh

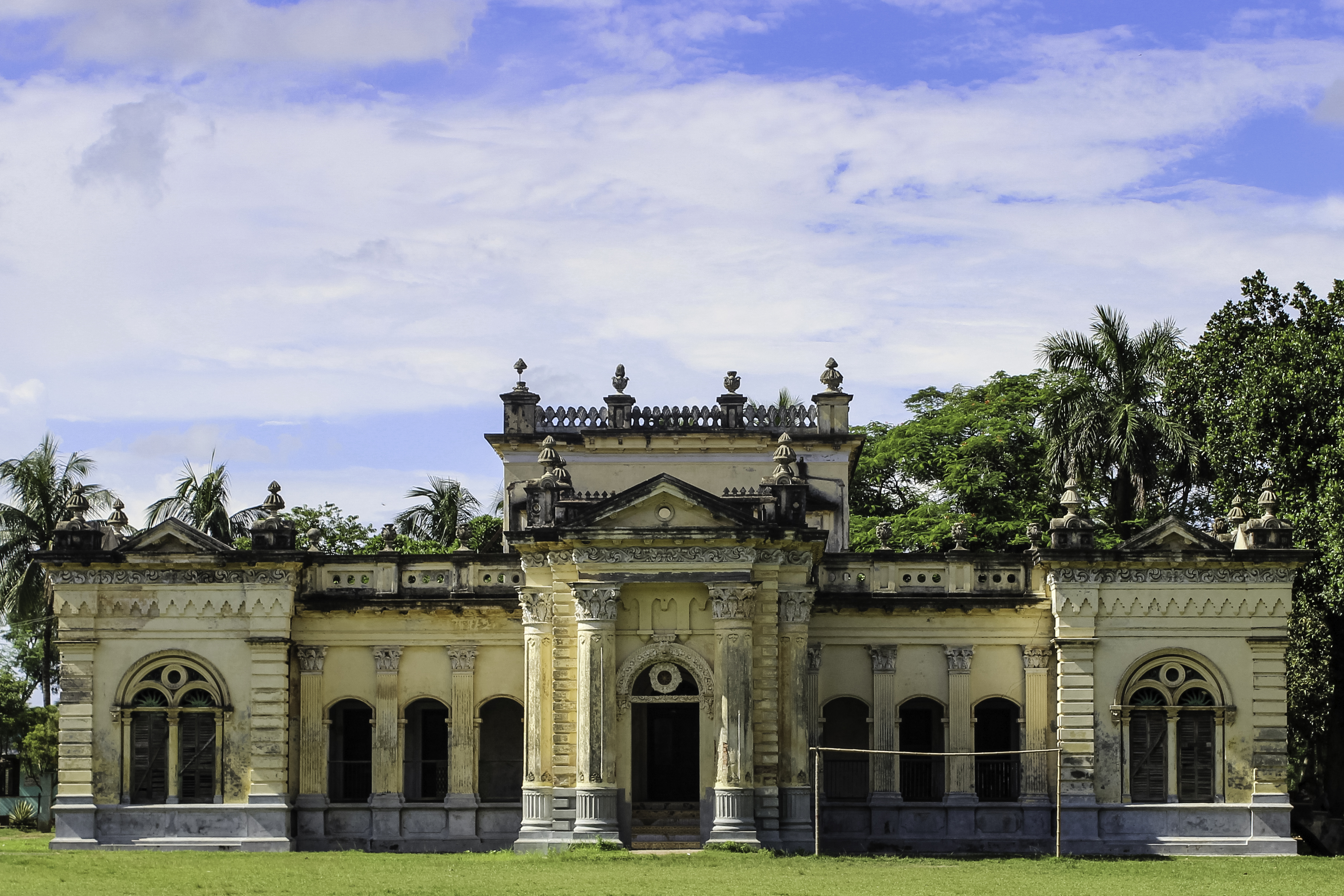
Natore Rajbari

== Modern Bangladeshi architecture ==
In the modern context, Bangladeshi architecture has become more diversified comprising reflections of contemporary architectural attributes, aesthetic and technologically advanced aspects. Since the inception of Bangladesh, economical advancement has boosted the architecture from its traditional forms to contemporary context. With the growing urbanization and modernization, the architectural form is turning into modernity covering a wide range of its heritage and tradition. The architecture of Bangladesh can provide insight into the history and lives of the Bangladeshi people.

Fazlur Rahman Khan was a structural engineer and architect, who initiated structural systems that are fundamental to tall building design today. Regarded as the "Einstein of structural engineering", his "tubular designs" for high rises revolutionized tall building design. Most buildings over 40-storeys constructed since the 1960s now use a tube design derived from Khan's structural engineering principles. He is the designer of Willis Tower – the second tallest building in the United States (once tallest and tallest in the world for many years), John Hancock Centre, Hajj Terminal, etc. Fazlur Rahman's innovations not only make the buildings structurally stronger and more efficient, they significantly reduce the usage of materials (economically much more efficient) while simultaneously allow buildings to reach even greater heights. Tubular systems allow greater interior space and further enable buildings to take on various shapes, offering unprecedented freedom to architects. He also invented the sky lobby for high rises and helped in initiating the widespread usage of computers for structural engineering. Fazlur Rahman is the foremost structural engineer-architect of the 20th century who left an unprecedented and lasting influence on the profession, both nationally and internationally. Fazlur Rahman, more than any other individual, ushered in a renaissance in skyscraper construction during the second half of the 20th century and made it possible for people to live and work in "cities in the sky". Khan created a legacy of innovations by blending the articulation of interior spaces with the evolved structural systems that are unparalleled and became an icon in both architecture and structural engineering.

Moreover, US architect Louis Kahn is also a notable influencer of modern Bangladeshi architecture. Several buildings in Bangladesh contains influence from the style of architecture as practised by Louis Kahn, most notable of which is the Jatiya Sangshad Bhaban.

Zebun Nessa Mosque is an urban mosque which is located in Ashulia on the outskirts of Dhaka. The mosque was designed in a pink concrete. It is the first Bangladeshi architecture to earn a place in the Time's World's Greatest Places for its architectural beauty.

== Gallery ==
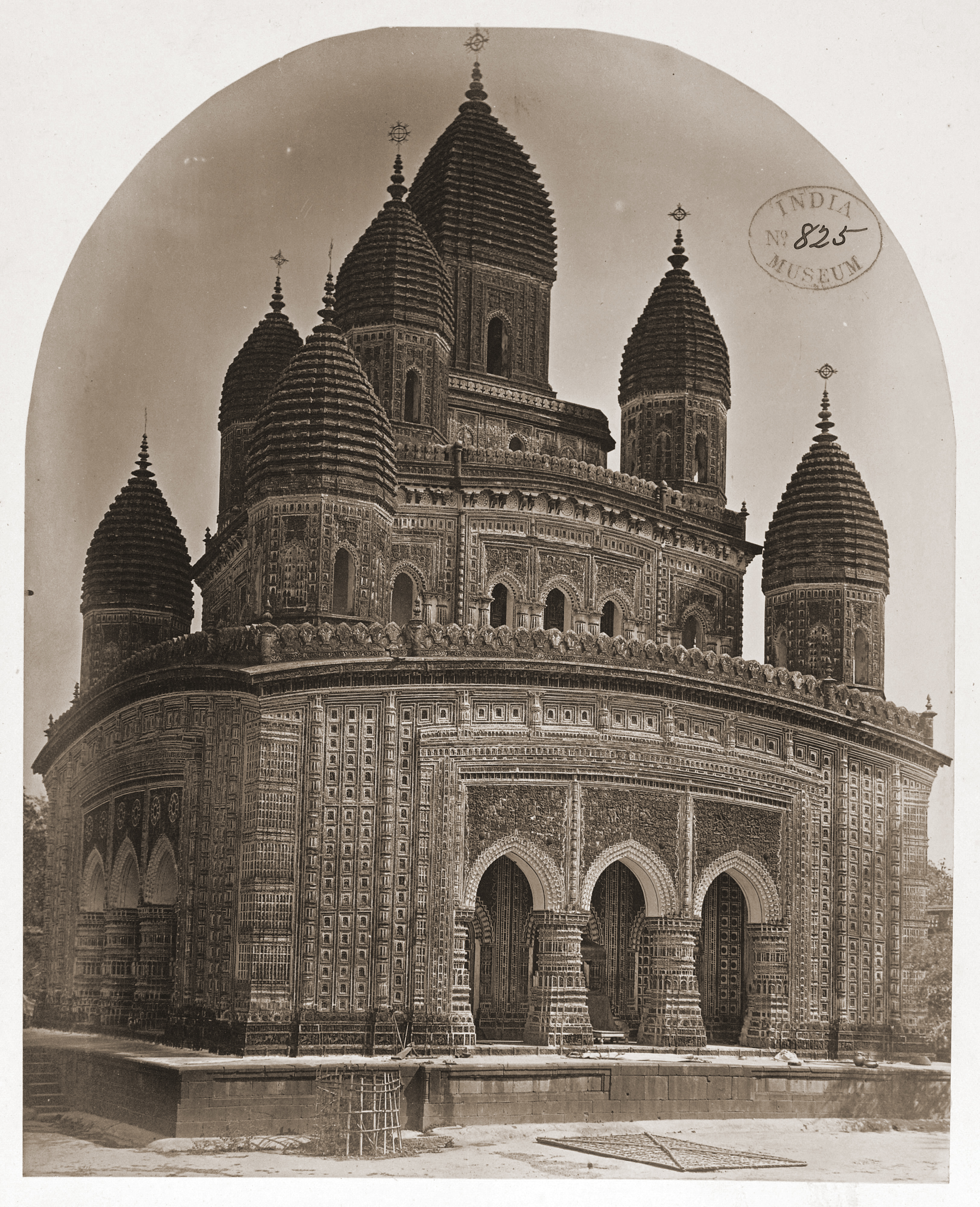
1752 Kantajew Temple, prominent temple architecture of Bangladesh.

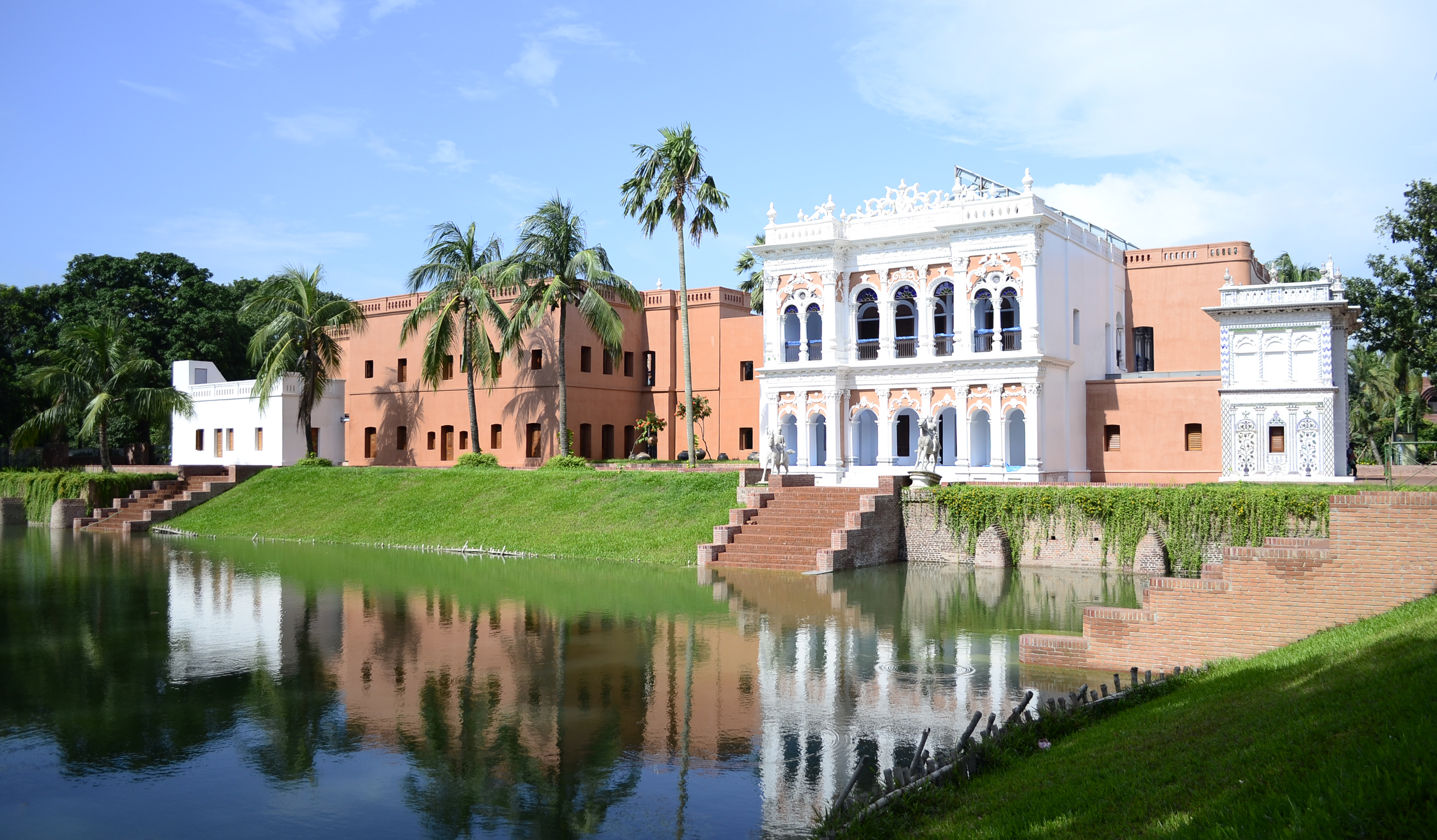
Sonargaon, the historical capital of the Baro-Bhuyan Confederacy.

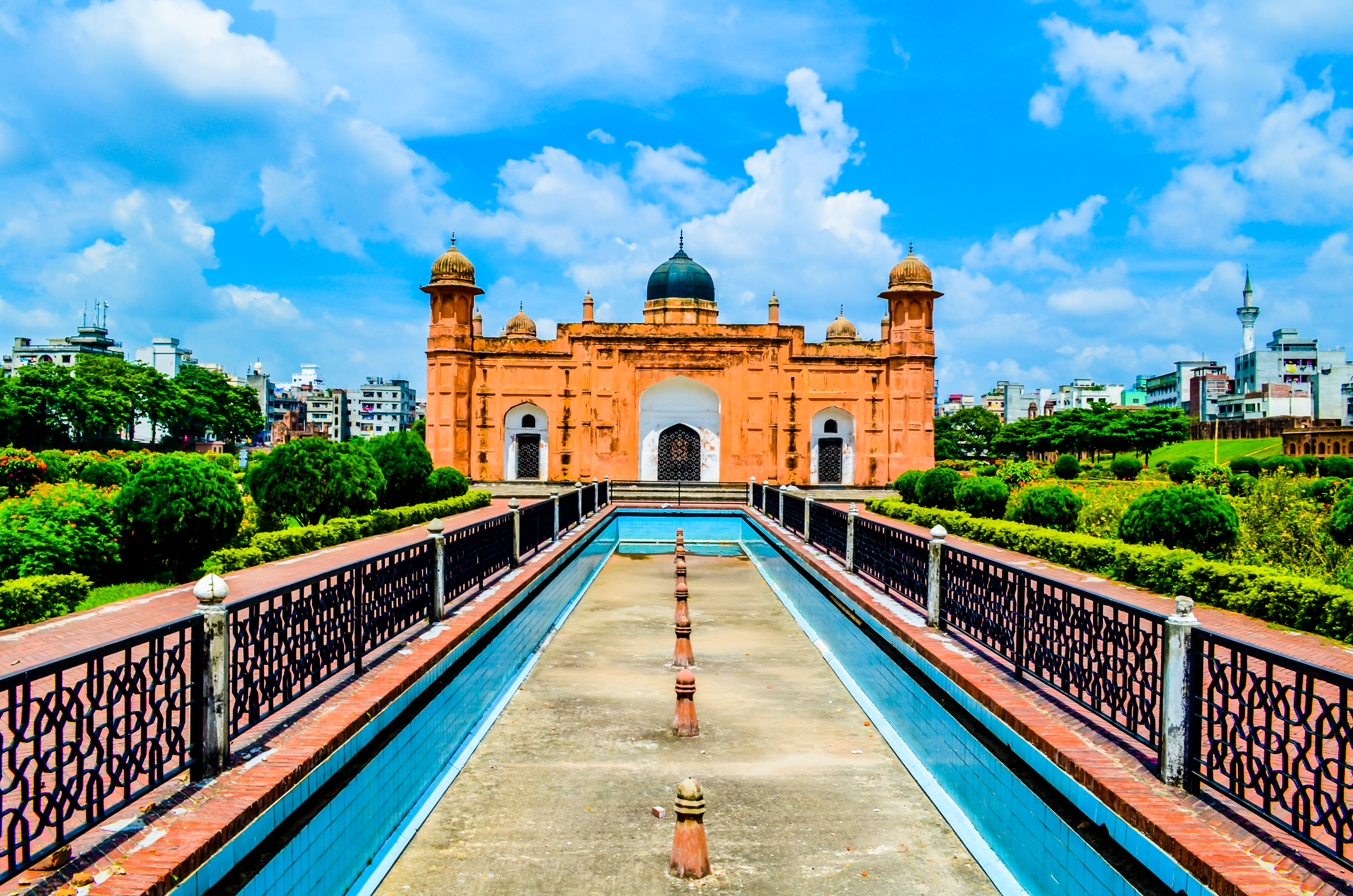
Lalbagh Fort, the center of Mughal military power in Dhaka.

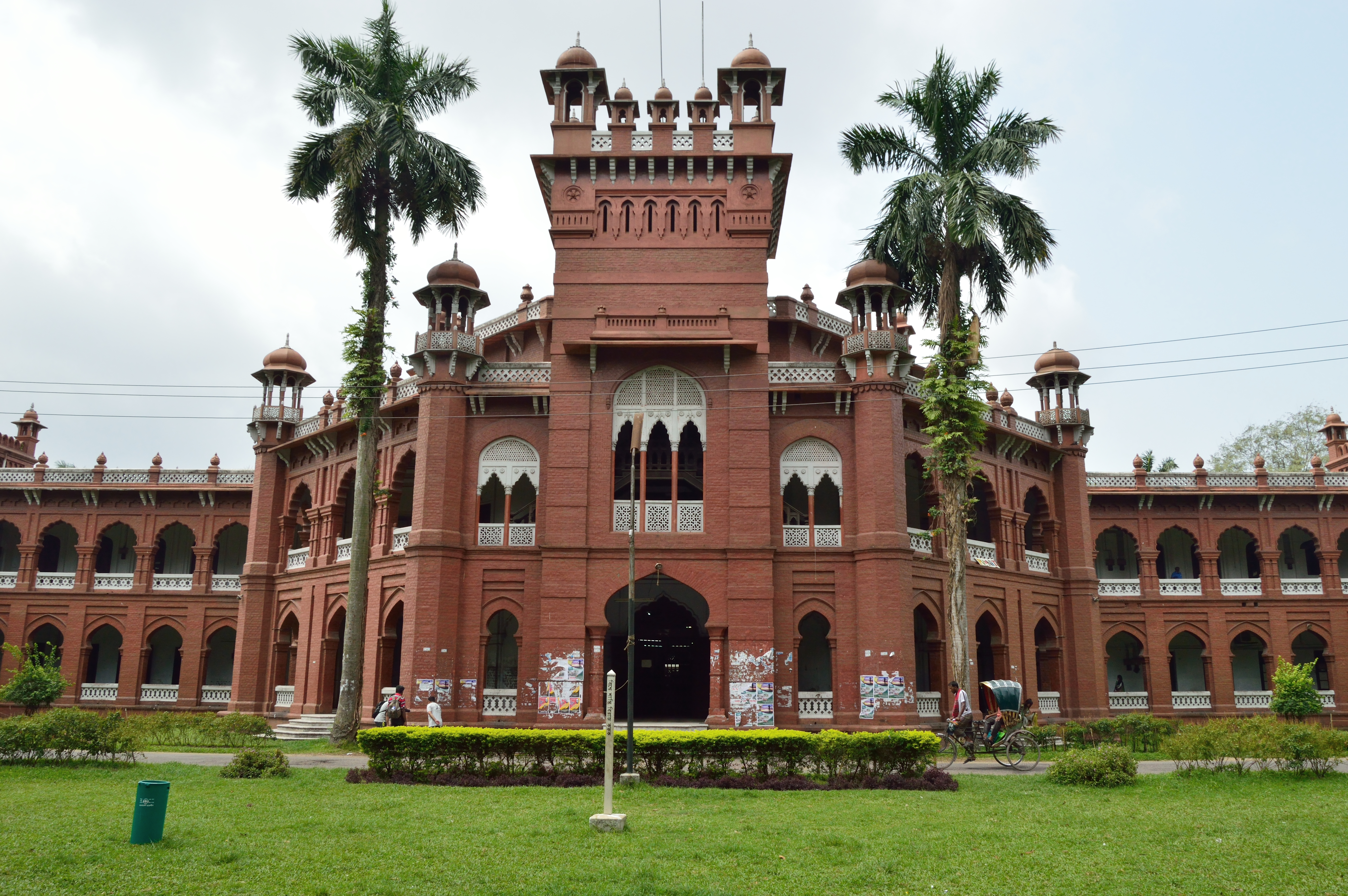
Curzon Hall of the University of Dhaka built in Indian style during British Raj-era

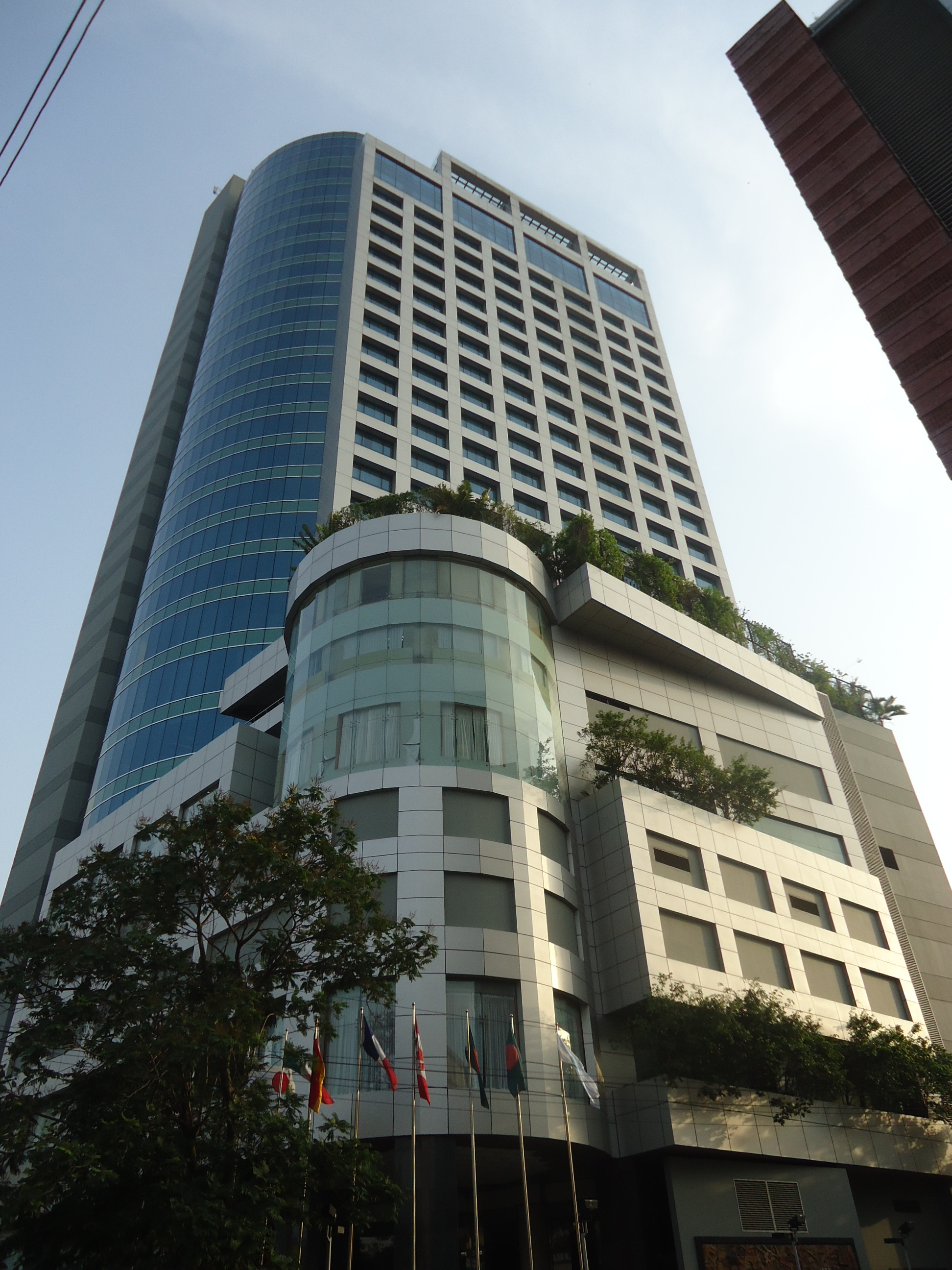
Dhaka Westin

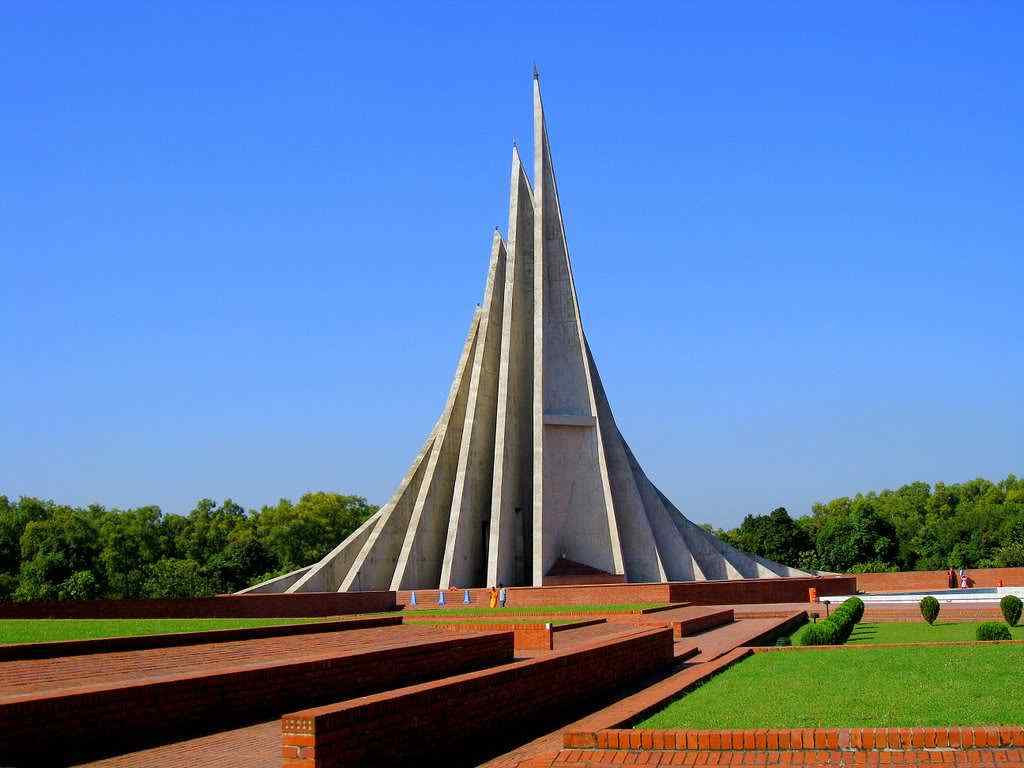
Jatiyo Smriti Soudho, a tribute to liberation war martyrs is also an architectural landmark

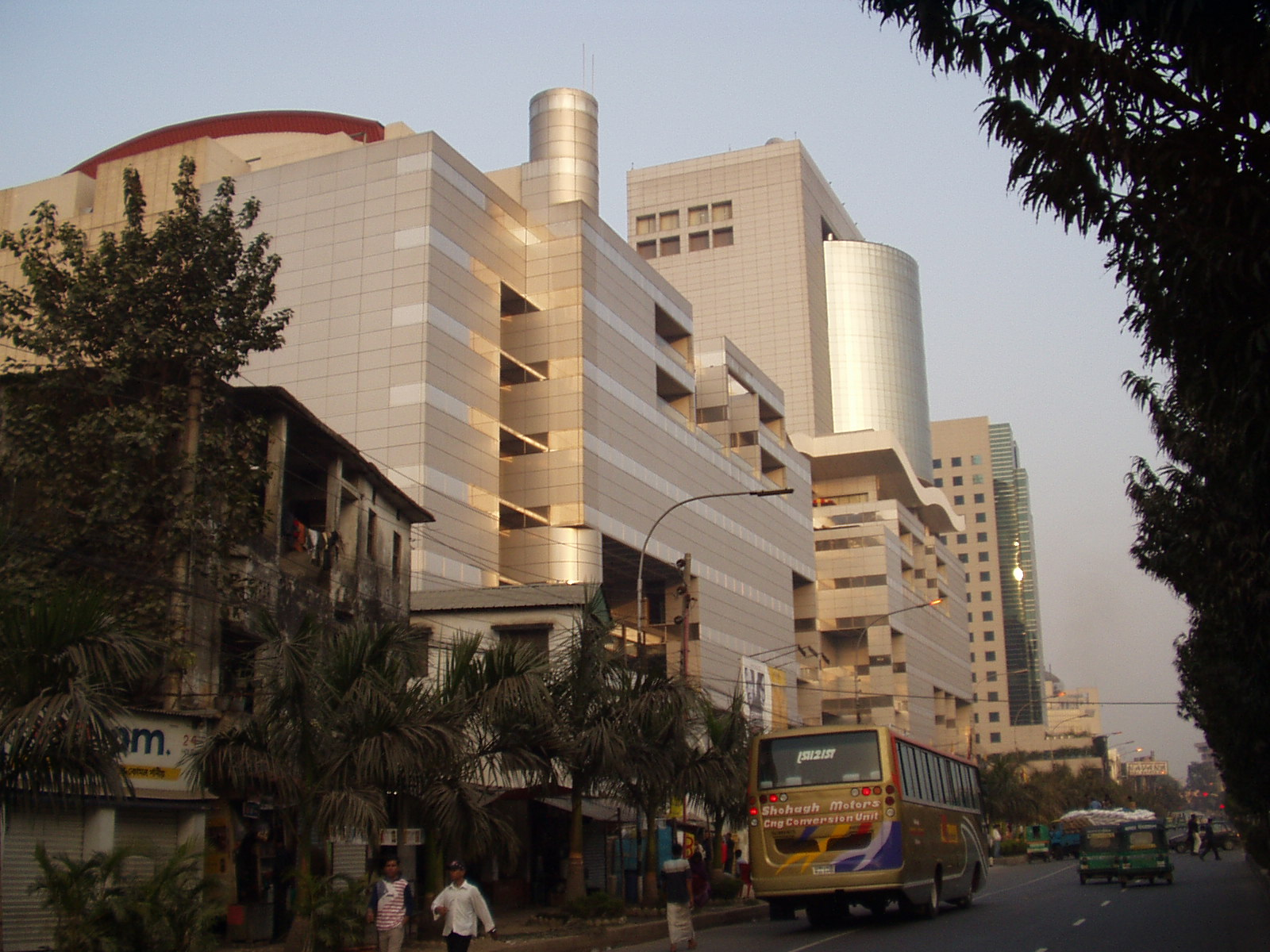
Outer view of Bashundhara City, Dhaka

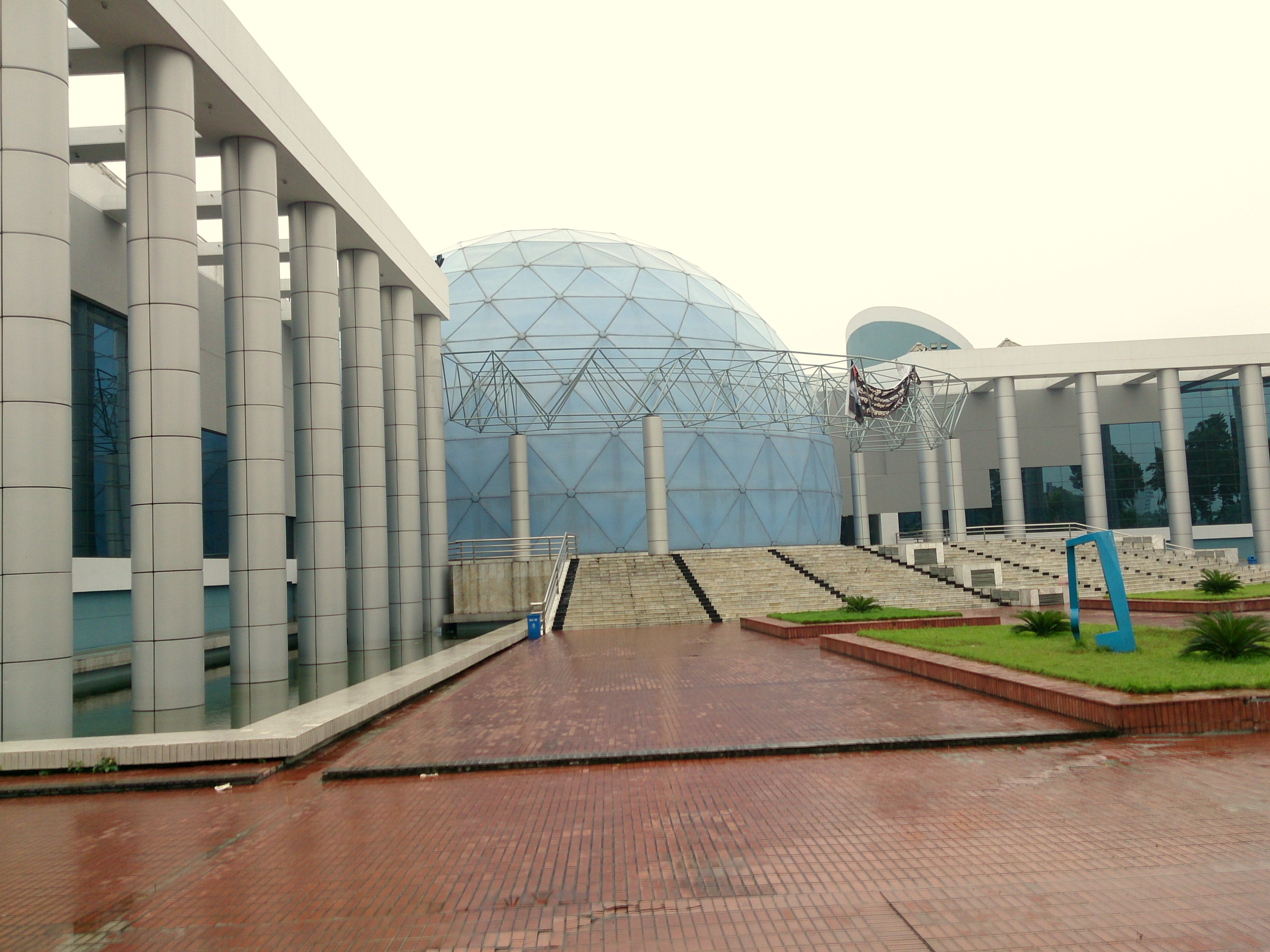
Novo Theatre (planetarium)

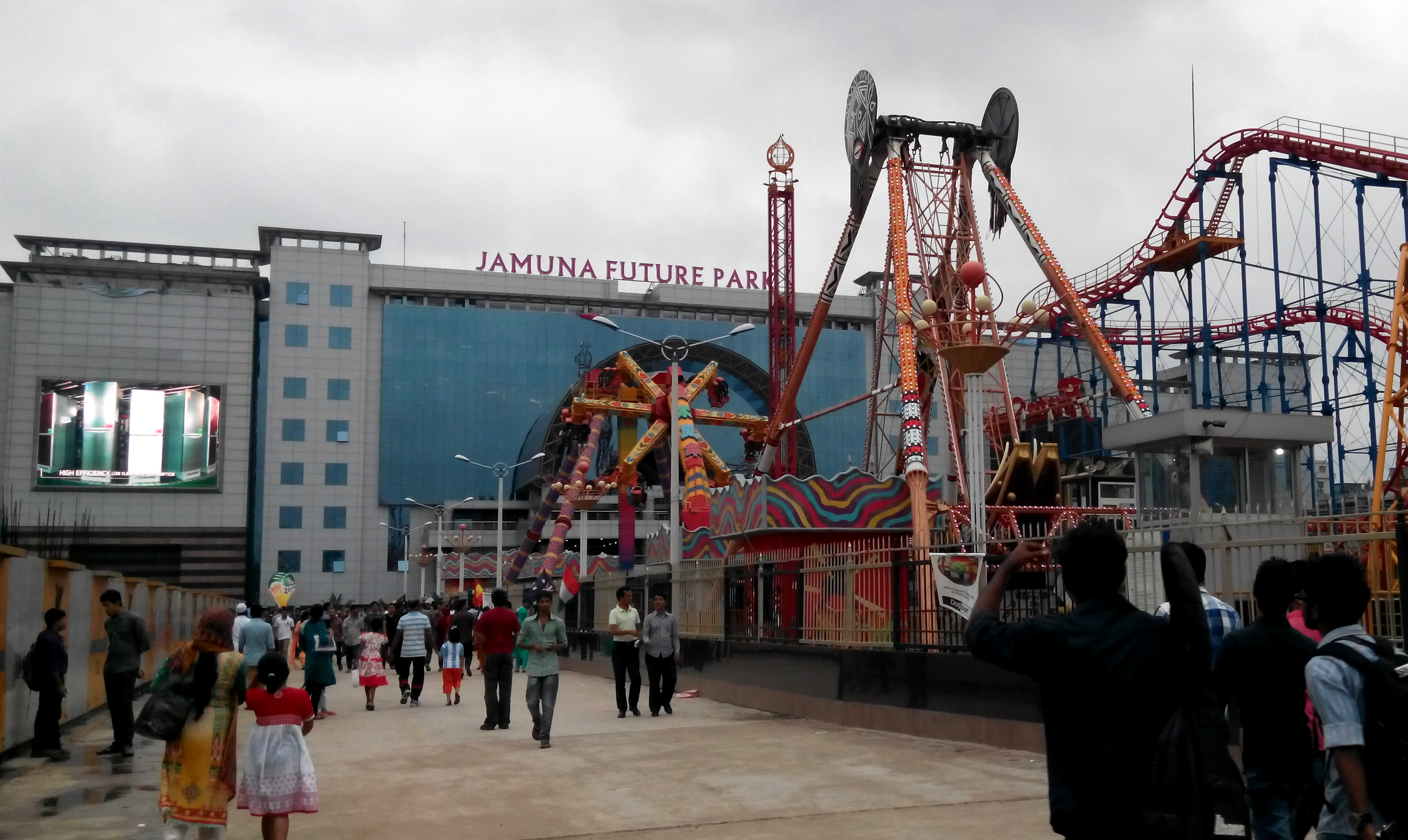
Jamuna Future Park, the largest shopping mall in South Asia

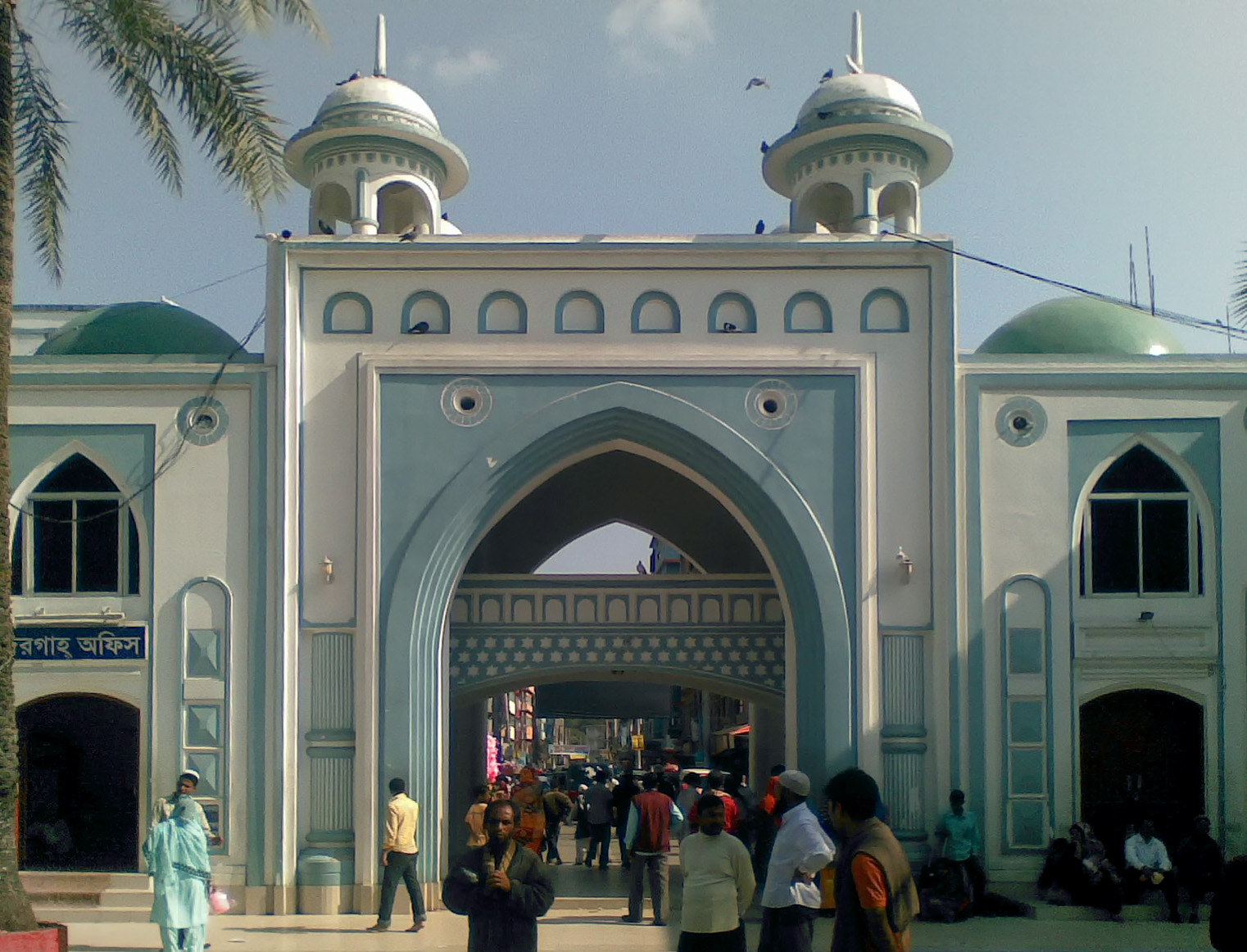
Dargah of Shah Jalal

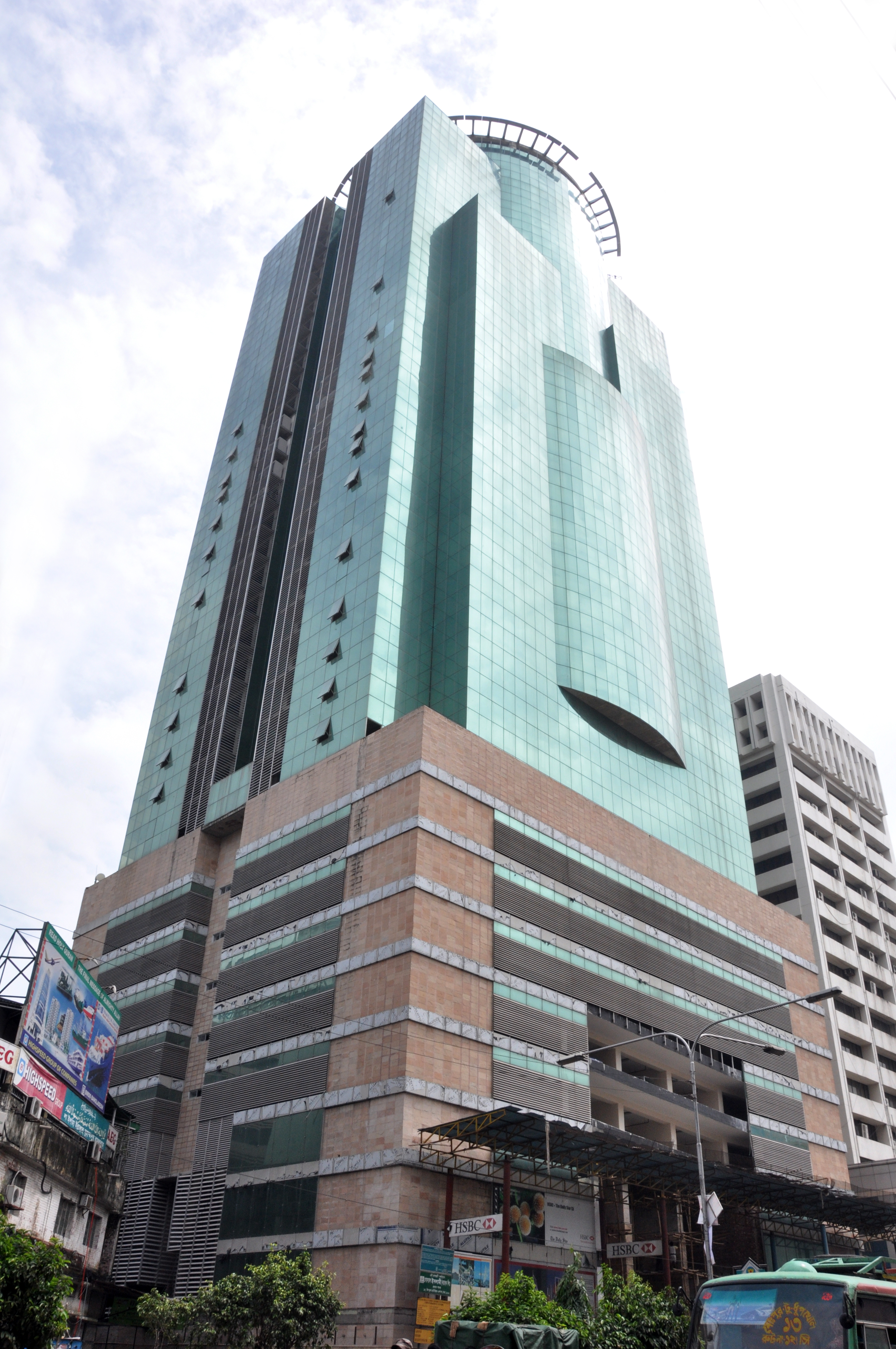
City Centre Bangladesh

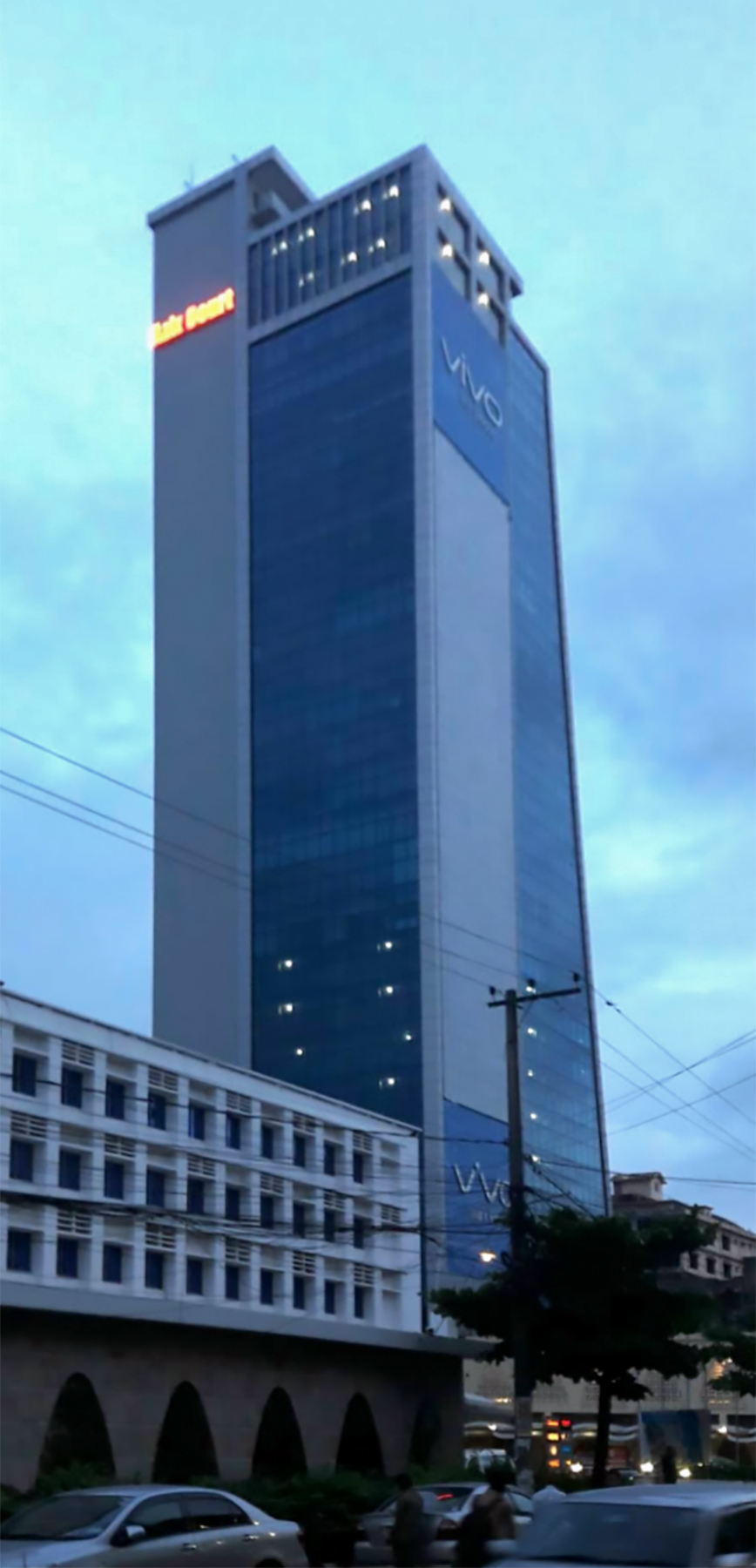
Aziz Court Imperial, Chittagong

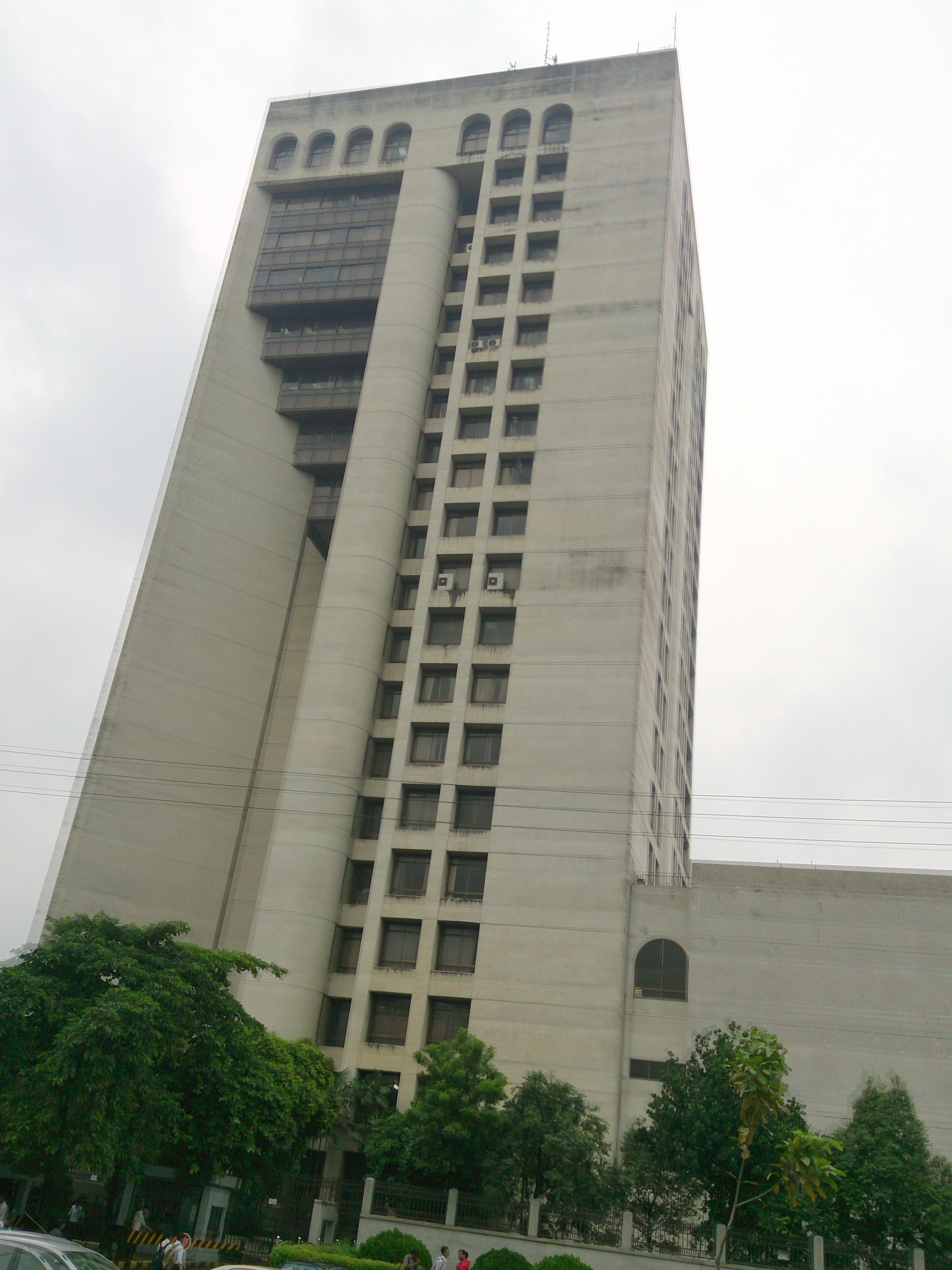
Islamic Development Bank (and BCS Computer City)

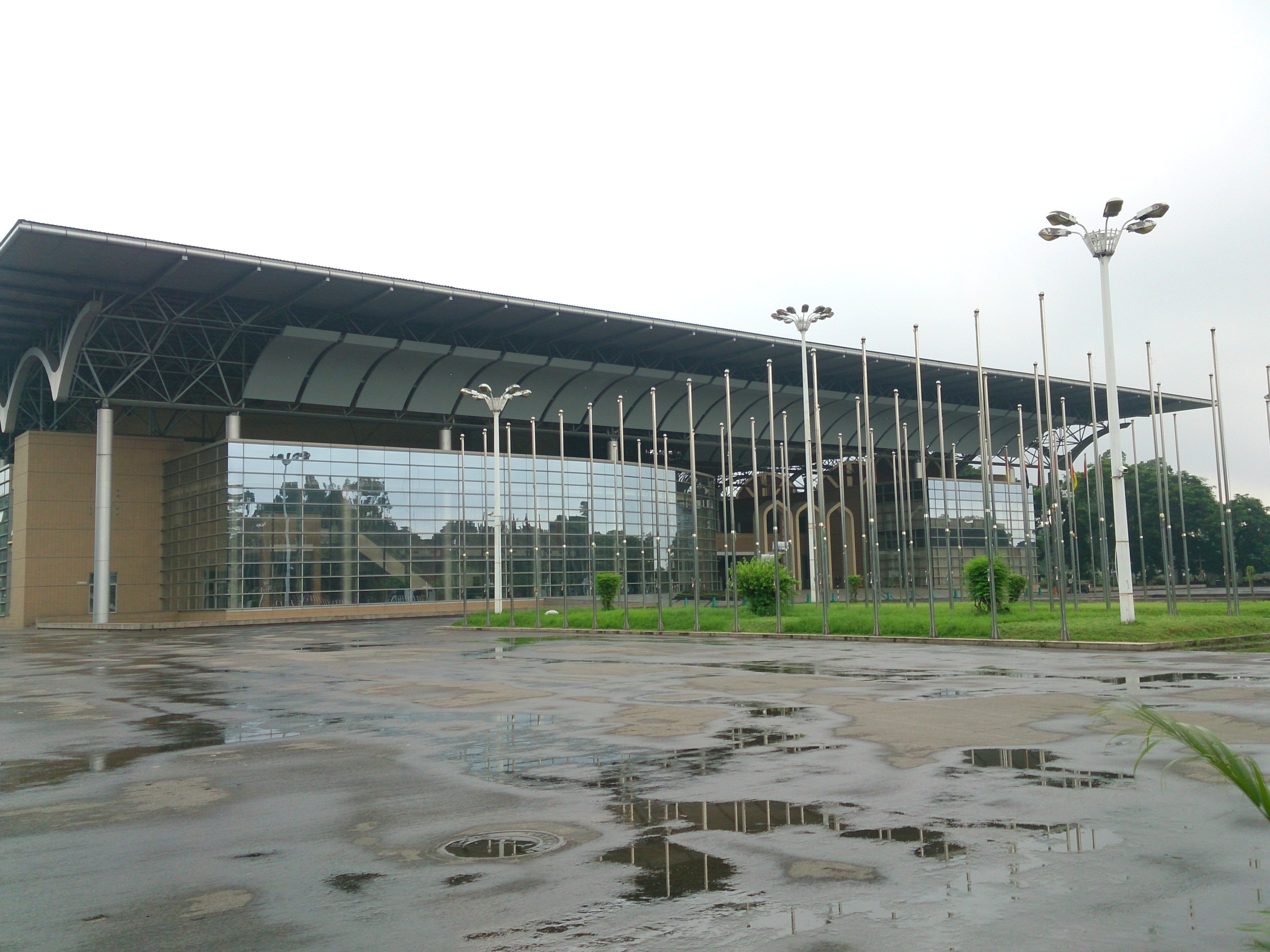
Bangladesh China Friendship Conference Center, Dhaka

== See also ==
- Architecture of Bengal
- List of Bangladeshi architects
- Muzharul Islam
- Shahbaz Khan Mosque
- Shona Mosque
- Bagha Mosque
- Khan Mohammad Mridha Mosque
