= Choto Sona Mosque =

Mosque in Chapai Nawabganj, Bangladesh

- ছোট সোনা মসজিদ
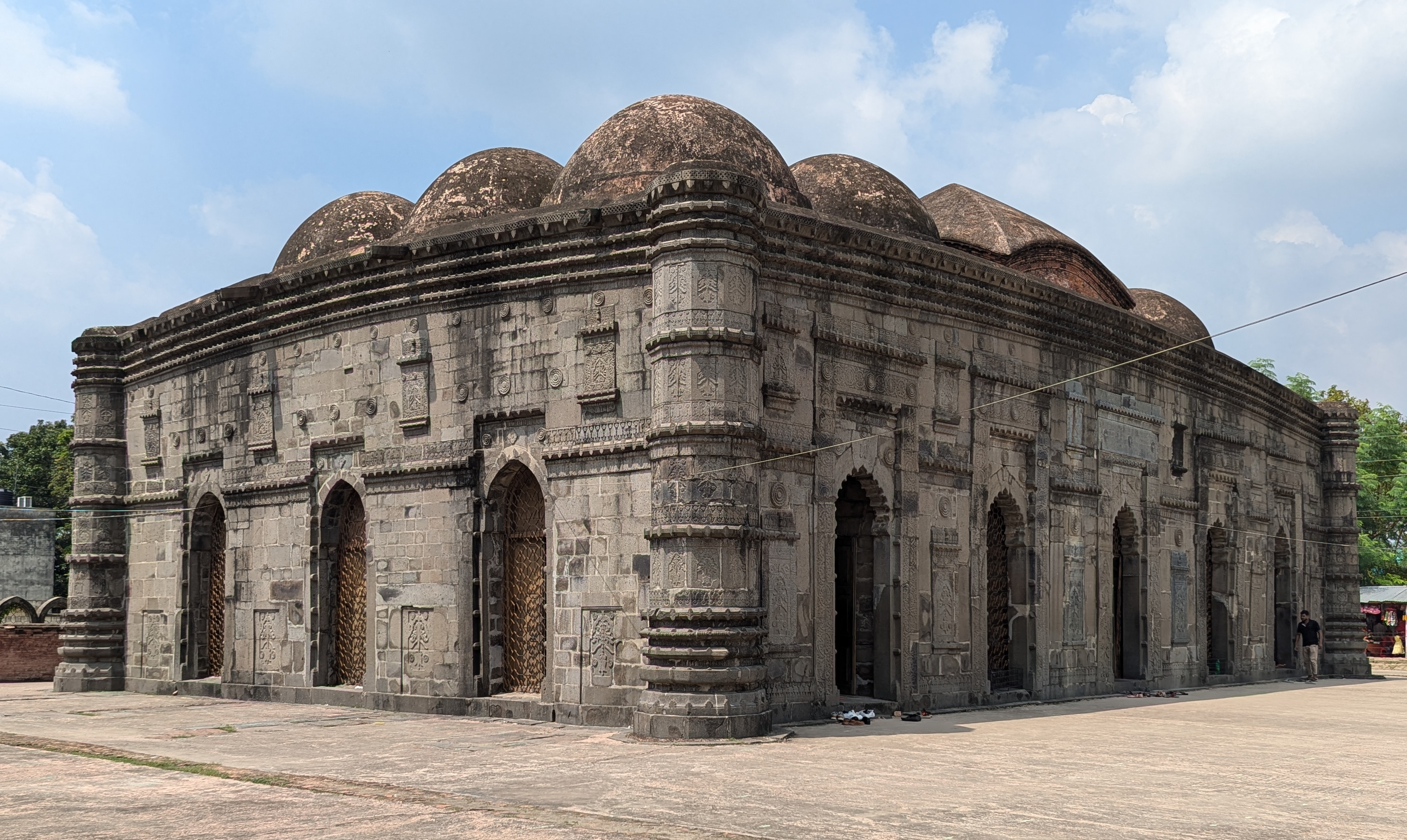

- Location of the mosque in Bangladesh

Religion
- Affiliation: Islam
- Ecclesiastical or organisational status: Mosque
- Status: Active

Location
- Location: Chapai Nawabganj, Rajshahi Division
- Country: Bangladesh
- Coordinates: 24°48′49″N 88°08′36″E

Architecture
- Type: Mosque architecture
- Style: Bengal Sultanate
- Founder: Wali Muhammad
- Completed: c. 1493 and 1519

Specifications
- Length: 25.1 m (82 ft)
- Width: 15.9 m (52 ft)
- Interior area: 258.64 m²
- Dome: 15
- Materials: Gilded gold; brick; granite stone; terracotta; glazed tiles

The Choto Shona Mosque (Bengali: ছোট সোনা মসজিদ, lit. 'Small Golden Mosque') is a 15th-16th-century mosque located in Chapai Nawabganj district, in the Rajshahi Division of Bangladesh. Situated about 3 kilometres (1.9 mi) south of the Kotwali Gate and 0.5 kilometres (0.31 mi) to the south-east of the Mughal Tahakhana complex in the Firozpur Quarter, the mosque is often referred to as "gem of Sultanate architecture" and "gem of Gaur".

== History ==
The mosque was built by Majlis Mansur Wali Muhammad bin Ali between 1493 and 1519 during the reign of Sultan Alauddin Husain Shah. The fifteen domes of the mosque were once gilded, hence its nomenclature, however the gold has since dissipated. During the earthquake in 1897, and subsequently restored in 1900-07. Three of the hemispherical domes, three of the chauchalas of the central aisle, and much of the west wall collapsed. The mosque has been restored and is one of the best-preserved Bengal Sultanate-style monuments that are under the protection of the Department of Archeology.

== Architecture ==
The mosque premises cover an area of 42 metres (138 ft) east-west by 43.5 metres (143 ft) north-south, and were originally surrounded by an outer wall, since restored, with a gateway in the middle of the eastern side.

Built of brick and stone, the mosque forms a rectangle having outside dimensions of 25.1 metres (82 ft) from north to south and 15.9 metres (52 ft) from east to west. Granite stone blocks on four walls have disappeared from the southern side of the west wall because of conservation works after the destruction by the earthquake of 1897. The cornices are curvilinear and have stone gutters to drain off the rainwater from the roof. There are five arched doorways in the eastern façade and three each on the north and south walls. Corresponding to the five archways in the east wall, there are five semi-circular mihrabs inside the west wall. The stones of most of these mihrabs have disappeared.

The interior of the mosque, measuring 21.2 by 12.2 metres (70 by 40 ft), is divided into three aisles by two rows of stone pillars, four in each row. A wide central nave has cut the aisles into halves, each half showing six equal square units with a side of 3.5 metres (11 ft). The nave has three rectangular units, each measuring 3.5 by 4.5 metres (11 by 15 ft). The interior of the mosque has therefore a total of fifteen units, of which the three rectangular units are covered with chauchala vaults, and the remaining twelve square units each by an inverted tumbler-shaped dome. They are all carried on radiating arches springing from the free-standing stone pillars and the engaged pilasters.

Carved stone arabesque with floral and ornamental patterns

=== Ornamentation ===
The most important ornamentation of the mosque is to be seen on the frontal courtyard of the mosque, recently excavated. The ornamentation consists of mosaic roundels in blue and white colours of variegated design. The mosaic design is not in situ, but a roundel has been composed by the excavators, putting the flakes in their appropriate places and exhibiting it in a room attached to the guesthouse nearby. At a distance of 14.5 metres (48 ft) to the east of the gateway, there is a stone platform containing two tomb sarcophagi inscribed with verses from the Quran and some names of God. It is unknown who is buried here. Alexander Cunningham suggests these are the tombs of Wali Muhammad, the builder of the mosque, and his father Ali.

The glamour of the Chhoto Sona Masjid is not there as it was originally, particularly because of the stripping of the decorative mihrabs and the mosque courtyard. However, the remains are nevertheless one of the most attractive monuments of Guar-Lakhnauti.

== Inscription ==
Inscription erected over the central entrance in the east. The lower left-hand corner which had the date is broken, obscuring the precise date. The Arabic inscription reads:

In the name of Allah, the Merciful and the Compassionate. The Almighty Allah says, ‘The mosques of Allah shall be visited and maintained by such as believe in Allah and the Last Day, establish regular prayers, and practice regular charity, and fear none except Allah. It is they who are expected to be on true guidance’ [Quran 9:18]. And the Prophet, may peace and blessings of Allah be upon him, has said, ‘He who builds a mosque for Allah, Allah will build a similar house in Paradise’ [Hadith]. The building of this Jami mosque [took place] during the reign of the Sultan of Sultans, the Sayyid of Saiyids, the fountain of auspiciousness, who has mercy on Muslim men and women, who exalts the words of truth and good deeds, who is aided by the assistance of the Supreme Judge, the warrior in the path of the Merciful, Khalifah of Allah by proof and testimony, defender of Islam and the Muslims, Sultan Ala al-Dunya wal-Din Abul Muzaffar Husain Shah, the Sultan al-Husaini, may Allah perpetuate his kingdom and sovereignty. This Jami mosque was built from pure and sincere motives, and trusting in Allah, by Wali Muhammad, son of Ali, who bears the title Majlis al-Majalis MajlisMansur [the title of a noble, lit. court of courts, court of the victor], may the Almighty Allah help him in this world and the next. Its auspicious date is the 14th day of the month of the blessed Rajab, may Allah increase its value and dignity ...

== Gallery ==
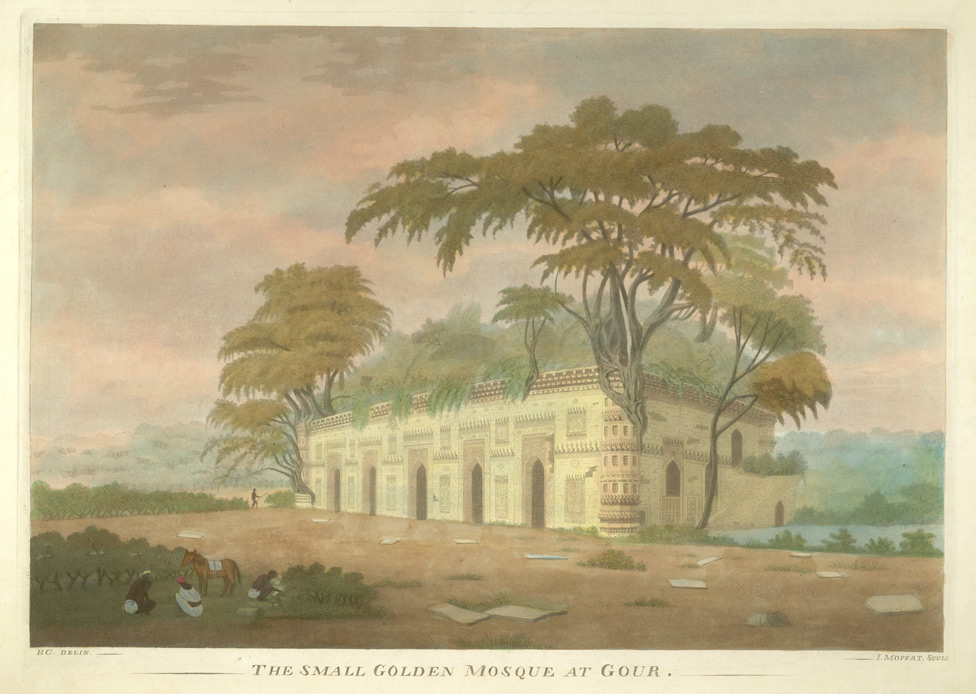
The mosque in 1808

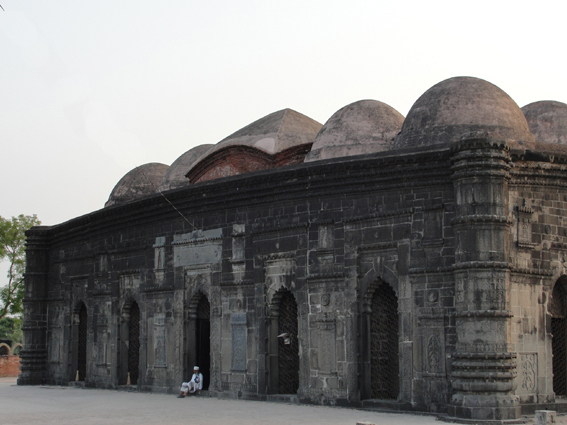
The rear of the mosque

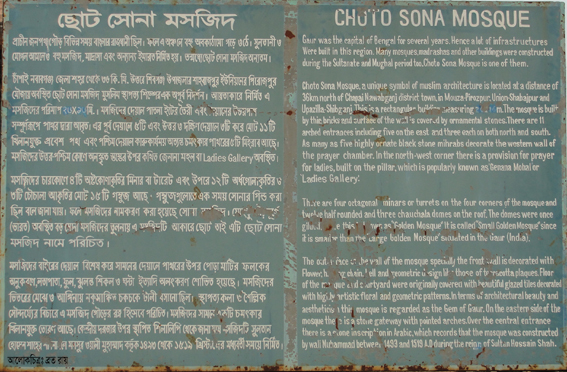
Entrance plaque, with a short history

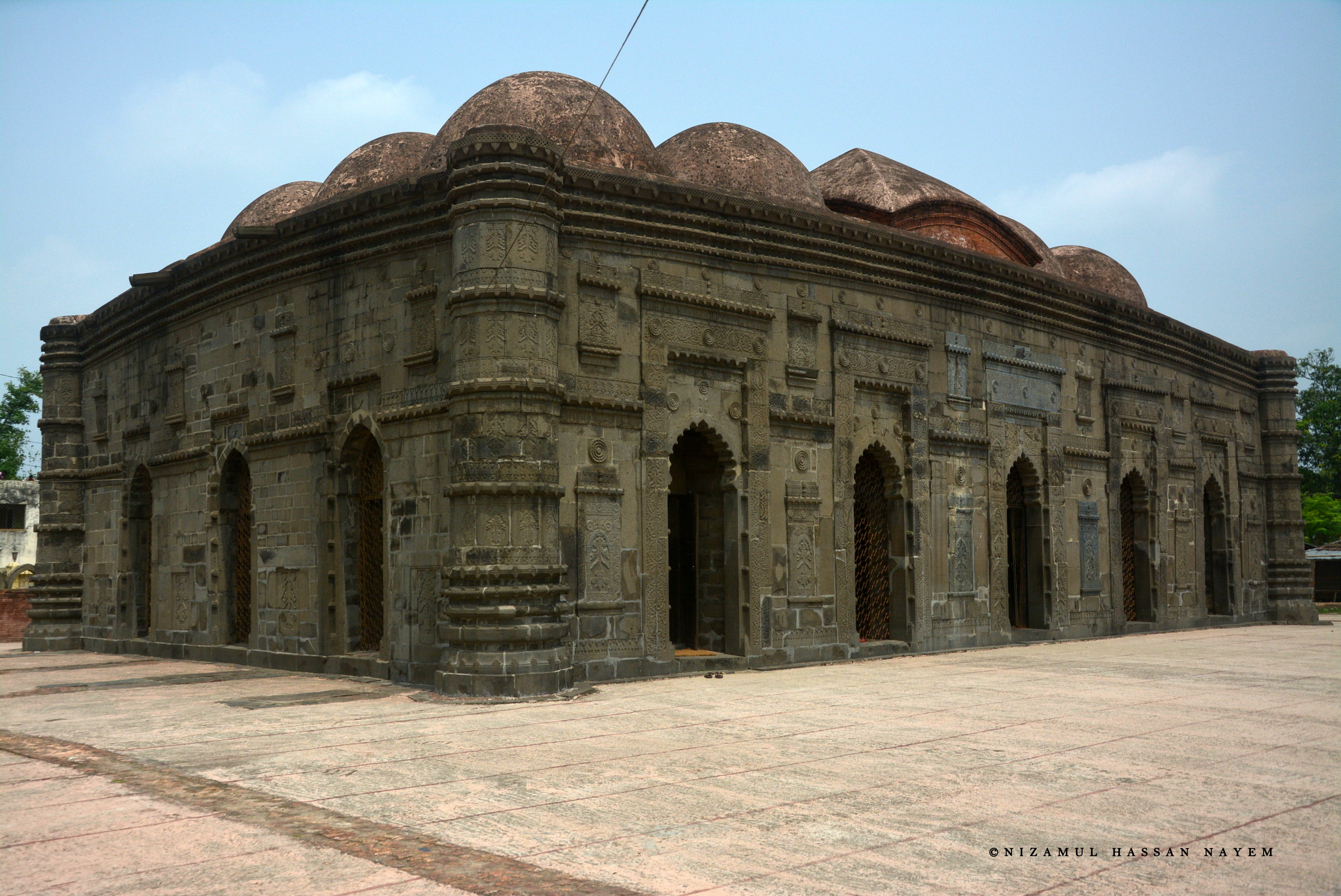
Side view of the mosque

== See also ==
- Islam in Bangladesh
- List of mosques in Bangladesh
- List of archaeological sites in Bangladesh
- Bengali Muslims

== Bibliography ==
- Hasan, Perween (2007). Sultans and Mosques: The Early Muslim Architecture of Bangladesh. Bloomsbury Academic. ISBN 978-1-84511-381-0.
- Michell, George, ed. (1984). The Islamic Heritage of Bengal. Unesco. ISBN 978-92-3-102174-9.
- Ahmed, Abu Sayeed M. (2006). Mosque Architecture in Bangladesh. Dhaka: UNESCO. p. 102. ISBN 9843234693.
