= Bagerhat =

Bagerhat বাগেরহাট Khalifatabad
- City & Municipality
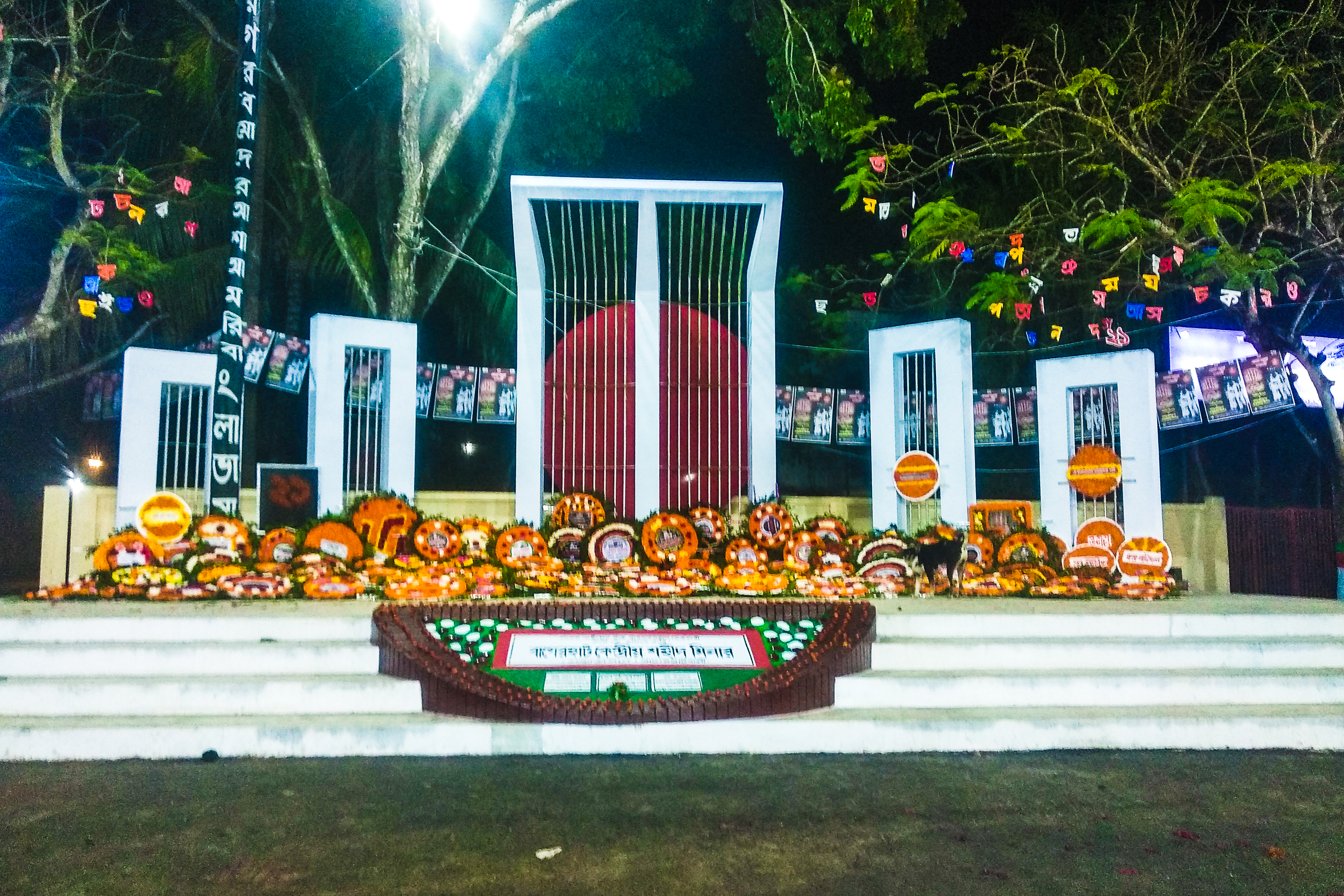
- Shaheed Minar, Bagerhat

- location of Bagerhat in Bangladesh Bagerhat (Bangladesh)
- Coordinates: 22.653°N 89.792°E
- Country: Bangladesh
- Division: Khulna
- District: Bagerhat
- Upazila: Bagerhat Sadar

Government
  - Type: Mayor–Council
  - Body: Bagerhat Municipality

Area
  - Total: 15.90 km^{2} (6.14 sq mi)

Population (2011)
  - Total: 49,073
  - Density: 3,086/km^{2} (7,994/sq mi)
  - Religions: Islam • Hinduism
- Time zone: UTC+6 (Bangladesh Time)
- National Dialing Code: +880

Bagerhat Municipality mahallah geocode map

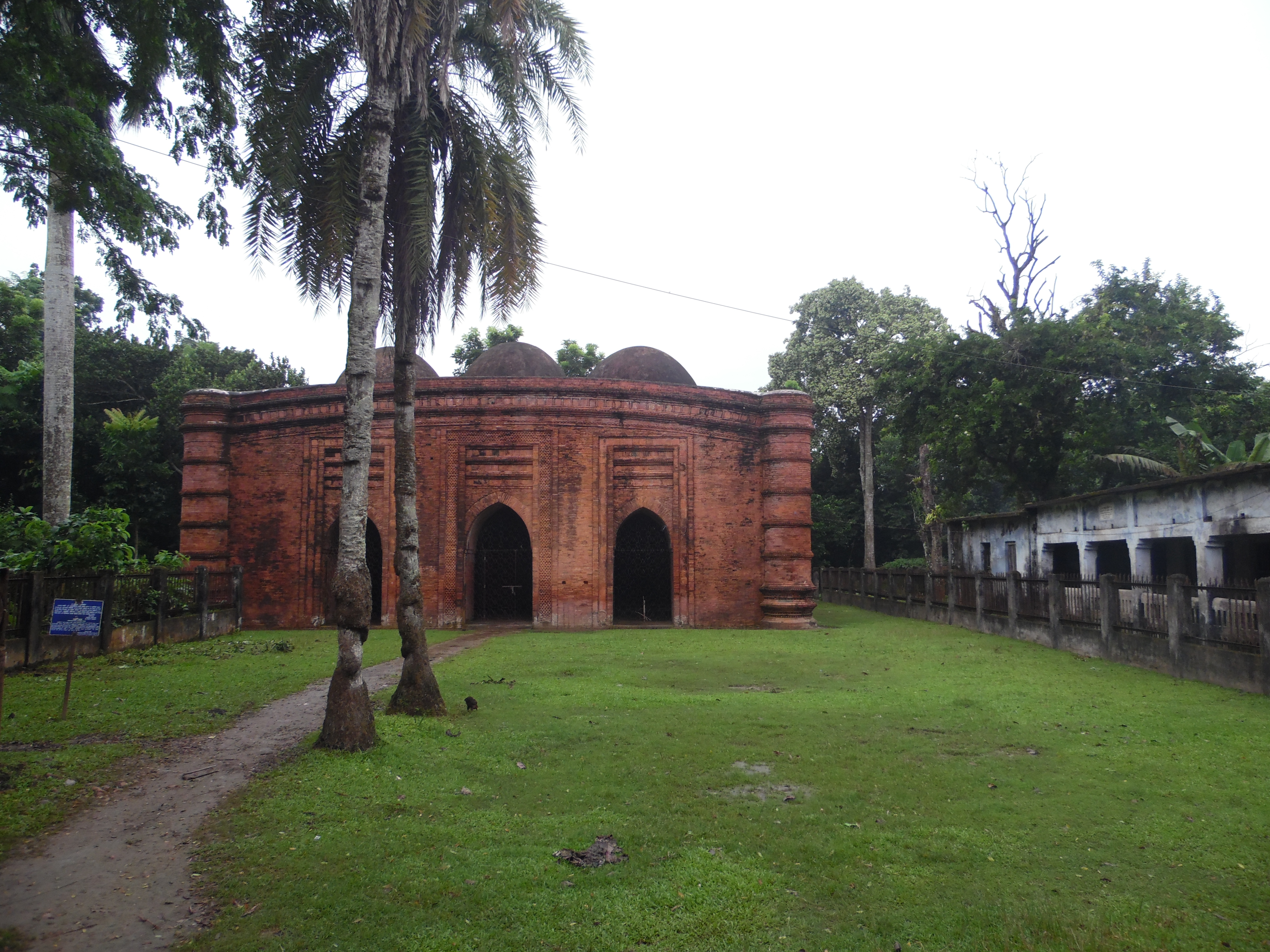
Nine Dome Mosque, Bagerhat, Bangladesh

Bagerhat is a city in southern Bangladesh and the headquarters of Bagerhat district. Located on the banks of the Bhairab river, Bagerhat has a population of around 50,000. It is located near the old city of Khalifatabad, now a UNESCO World Heritage Site.

== Demographics ==
Religions in Bagerhat city (2011)
Religion	Percent
Islam	78.98%
Hinduism	20.96%
Other or not stated	0.06%

At the 2011 census, Bagerhat had 11,982 households and a population of 49,073. 8,322 (16.96%) were under 10 years of age. Bagerhat has a sex ratio of 995 females per 1000 males and a literacy rate of 75.8%.
