= Singair Mosque =

Mosque in Bagerhat, Bangladesh

- সিংগাইর মসজিদ
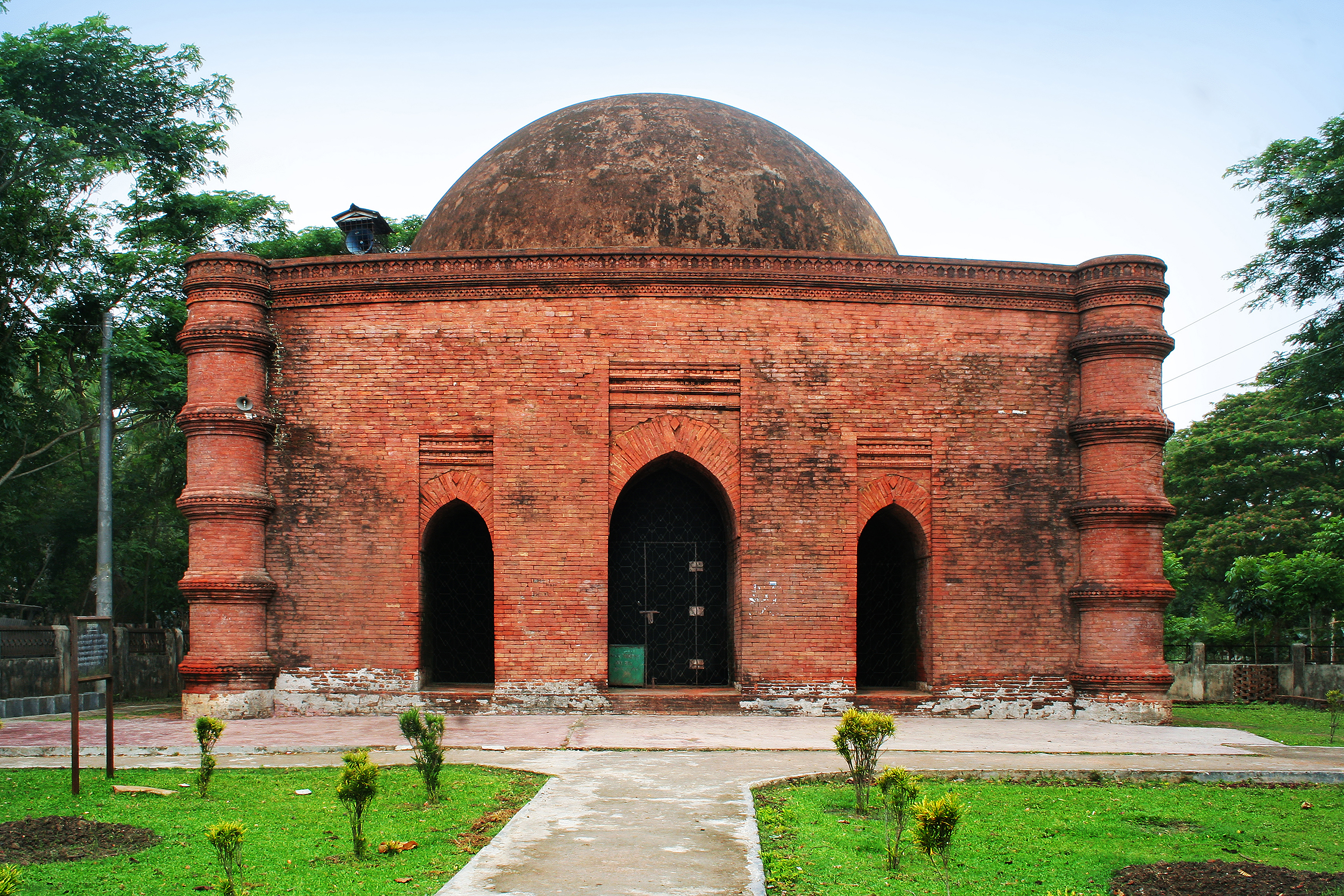
- The east façade of the mosque

- Location of the mosque in Bangladesh

Religion
- Affiliation: Sunni Islam
- Ecclesiastical or organizational status: Mosque
- Status: Active

Location
- Location: Bagerhat, Khulna Division
- Country: Bangladesh
- Interactive map of Singair Mosque
- Administration: Department of Archaeology
- Coordinates: 22°40′22″N 89°44′33″E

Architecture
- Type: Mosque architecture
- Style: Indo-Islamic; Bengal Sultanate
- Completed: Mid-15th century CE

Specifications
- Length: 13.34 m (43 ft 9 in)
- Width: 13.34 m (43 ft 9 in)
- Interior area: 2.4 m^{2} (26 sq ft)
- Dome: One
- Materials: Burnt brick

UNESCO World Heritage Site
- Official name: Mosque City of Bagerhat
- Type: Cultural
- Criteria: iv
- Designated: 1985 (9th session)
- Reference no.: 321
- Region: Asia-Pacific

The Singair Mosque (Bengali: সিঙ্গাইর মসজিদ) (Note: Transliterations vary. Signage on site spells it Singair. Perween Hasan uses Shingria and Banglapedia uses Singria, whereas most other sources use Singair.) is a 15th-century Sunni mosque that forms a part of the Mosque City of Bagerhat, a designated UNESCO World Heritage Site in the southwestern Khulna Division of Bangladesh. The mosque is characterized by its single-domed, square structure constructed with exposed brick and adorned with terracotta decorations.

== Location ==
The Singair Mosque is indeed a constituent of the Mosque City of Bagerhat, located in the south-western region of Bangladesh. Positioned on the southern side of the Bagerhat-Khulna Highway, it is situated approximately 200 metres (660 ft) southeast of the Sixty Dome Mosque.

== History ==
The Mosque lacks any inscriptions that can be used to establish its exact date of construction. Architect Abu Sayeed M Ahmed estimates that it is from the 15th century. Other experts believe, based on the known ages of stylistically similar local buildings, that it was built in the mid-15th century. There is archaeological evidence that at one time the mosque compound was surrounded by a wall with towers at the corners and an entrance gate on the east.

Banglapedia describes the mosque's condition in the early 1970s as "in utter ruin". The Bangladeshi Department of Archaeology took over management of the site in 1975. In 1984, archaeologist Johanna E. van Lohuizen de Leeuw wrote that the building had been partly restored, but "its corner towers are still in a shocking state". The Mosque City of Bagerhat, of which Singair Mosque is a part, was inscribed on the list of UNESCO World Heritage Sites in 1985. The mosque was rated as being in a "fair state of preservation" in the 2010s.

== Architecture ==
The mosque is a square, that externally measures 13.34 metres (43 ft 9 in) long and wide, while internally it has a square plan of 2.4 square metres (26 sq ft). It has a single hemispherical dome. The entirety is constructed of brick. There are three doorways in the east, and one each in the north and south. The central doorway in the east is higher and wider than the others. The exterior of the west wall has a mihrab projection from the ground to the cornice. At the four corners of the building are engaged circular towers which rise to roof level. The cornice is gently curved, and is 30 centimetres (12 in) higher at the center than at the ends.

The doorways are pointed archways set within rectangular recesses, at the top of which are several horizontal rows of terracotta ornamentation. The corner towers are divided horizontally at regular intervals by raised bands. The cornice has two bands decorated with terracotta.

The mosque's walls are 2.1 metres (7 ft) thick. The interior has a single mihrab in the qibla wall, on axis with the central entrance in the east. It is flanked by two decorated octagonal pilasters from which springs a multifoil arch with terracotta rosettes in the spandrels. All these are bordered by two rectangular frames, the space between which is filled with a four-petalled mesh in terracotta. To each side of the mihrab is a multifoil arched niche in a rectangular recess. The north and south walls each have two similar, but smaller niches.

Squinches spring from brick pilasters to support the base of the dome.

== Gallery ==
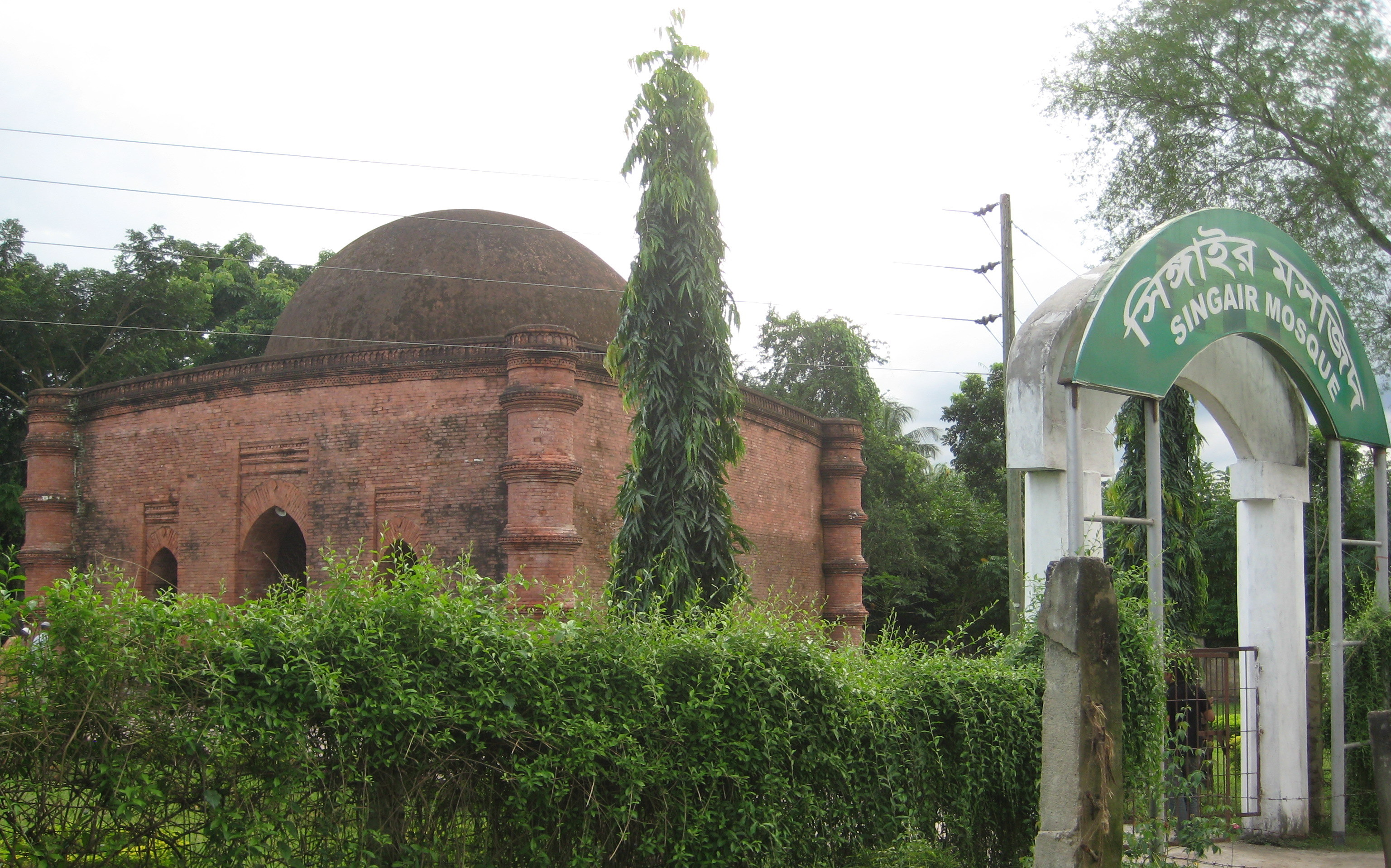
Singair Mosque, viewed from the Bagerhat-Khulna Highway

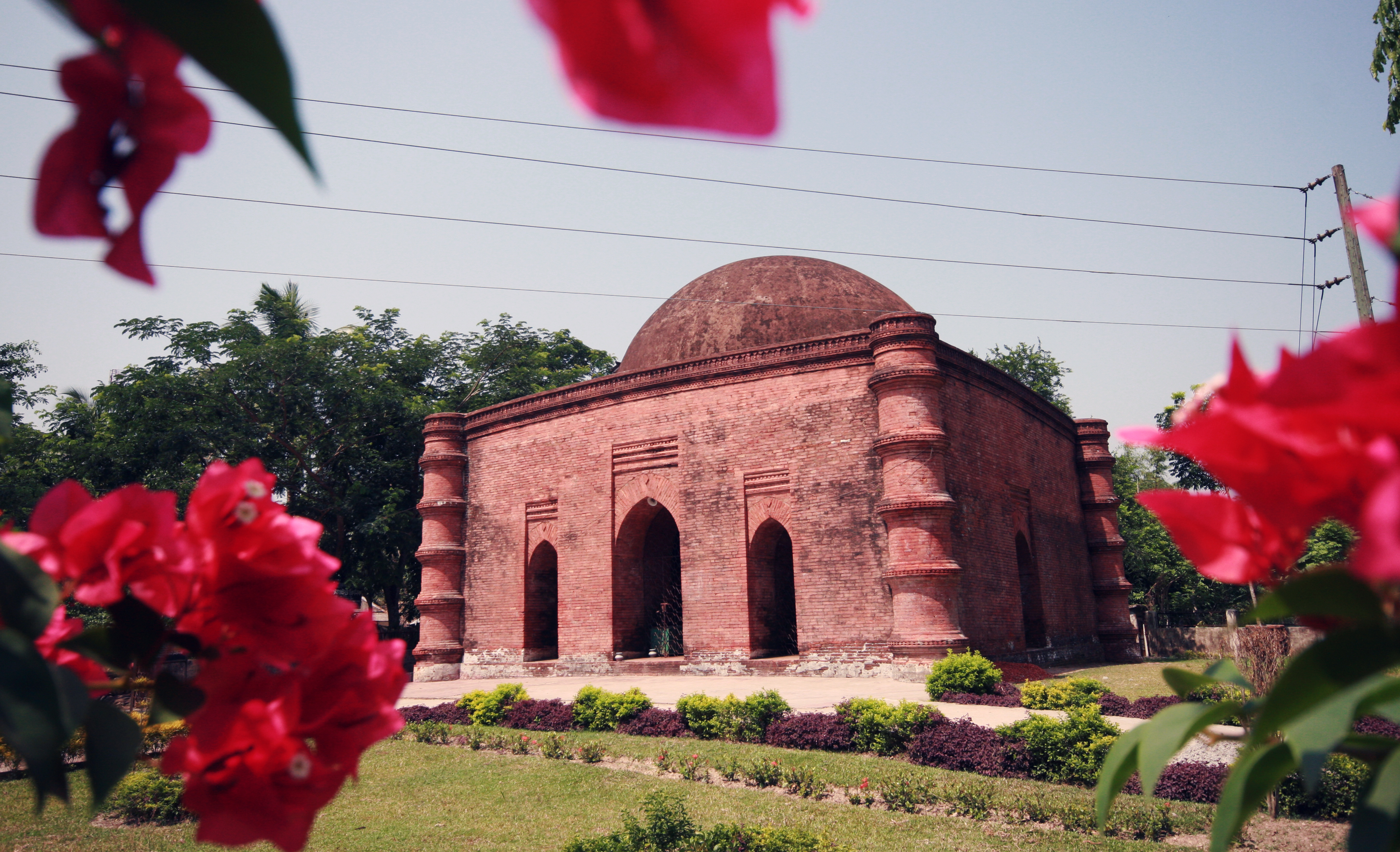
Wide view of the mosque

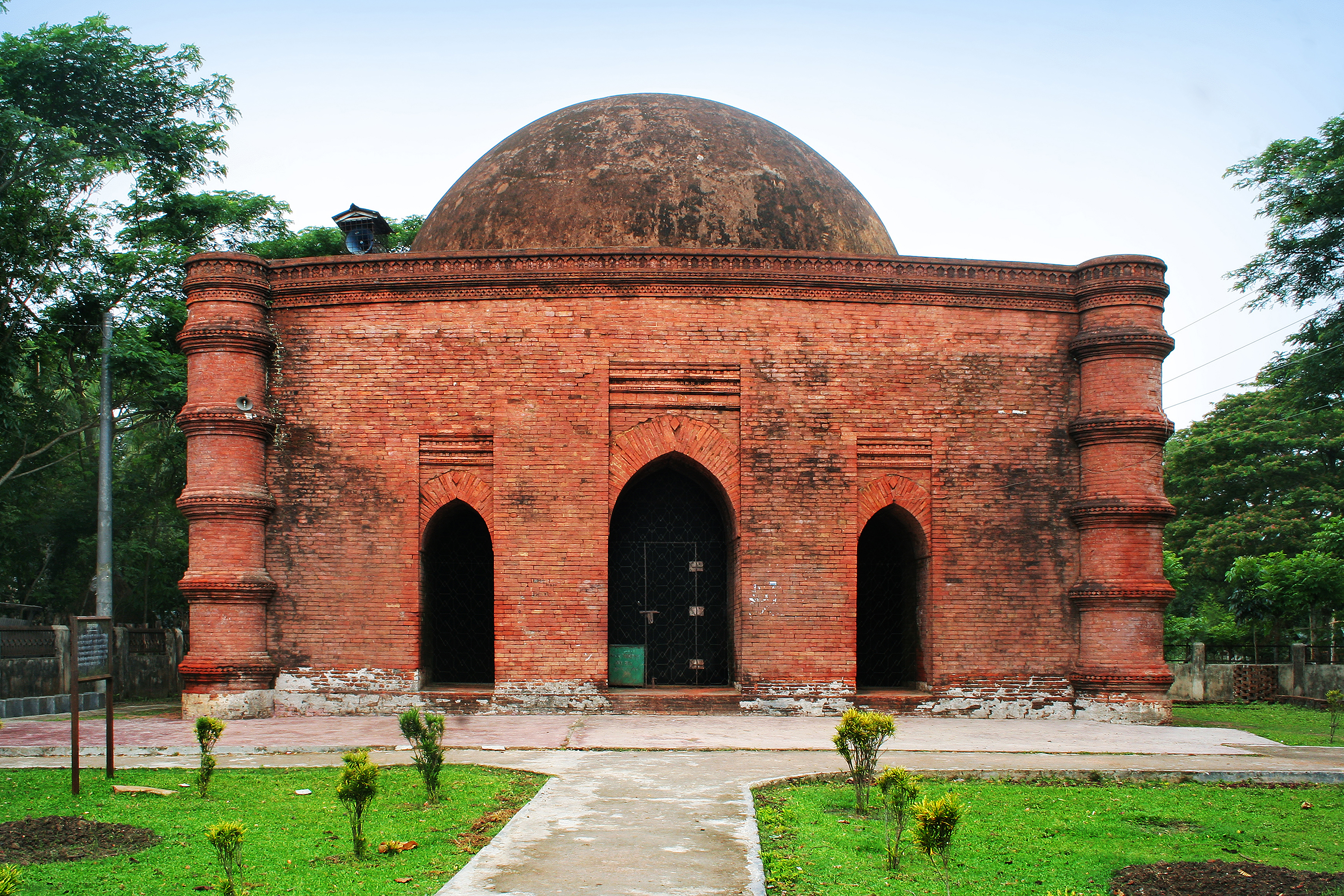
The curved cornice, characteristic of Sultanate architecture, is an indigenous form derived from village huts.

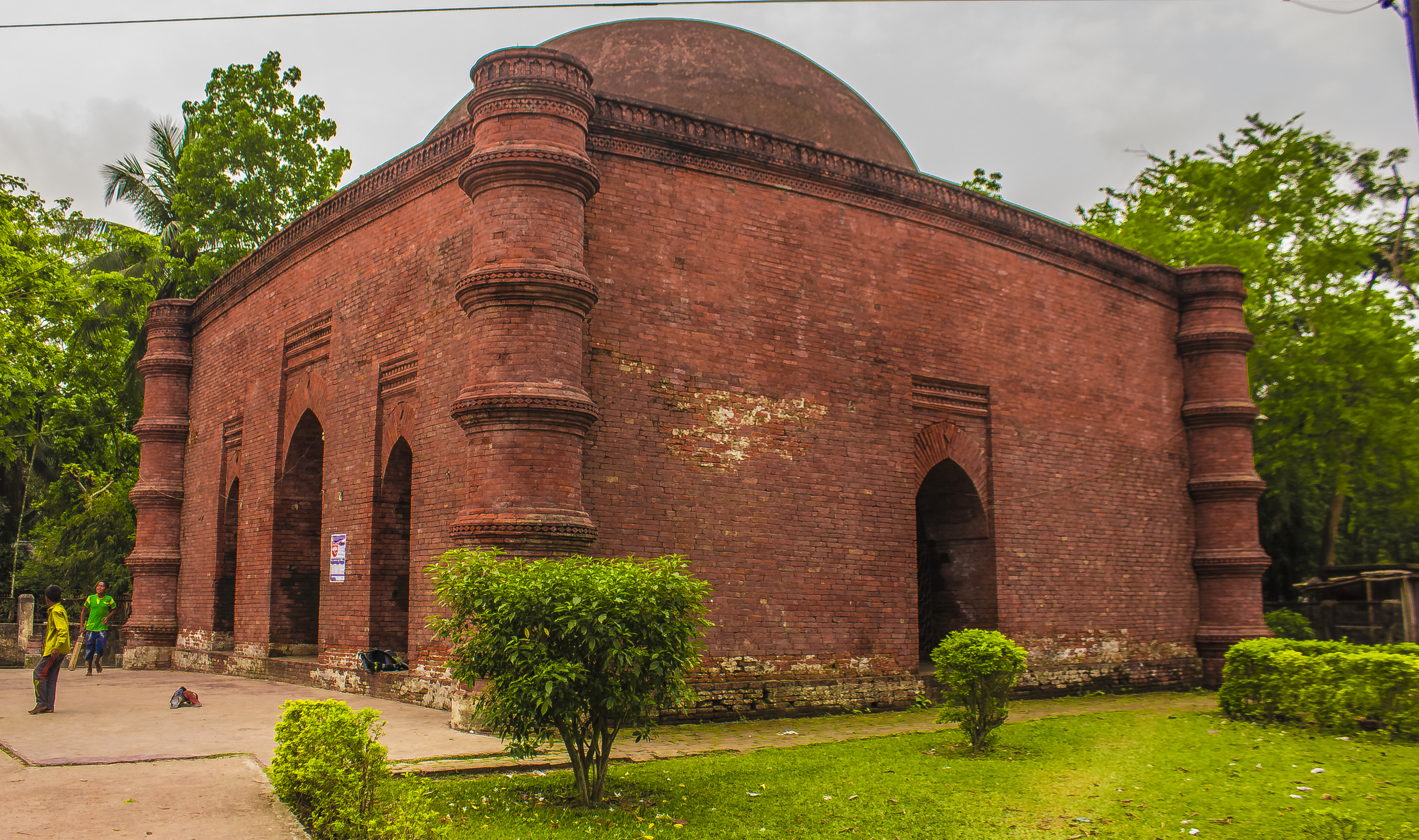
Side view of the mosque

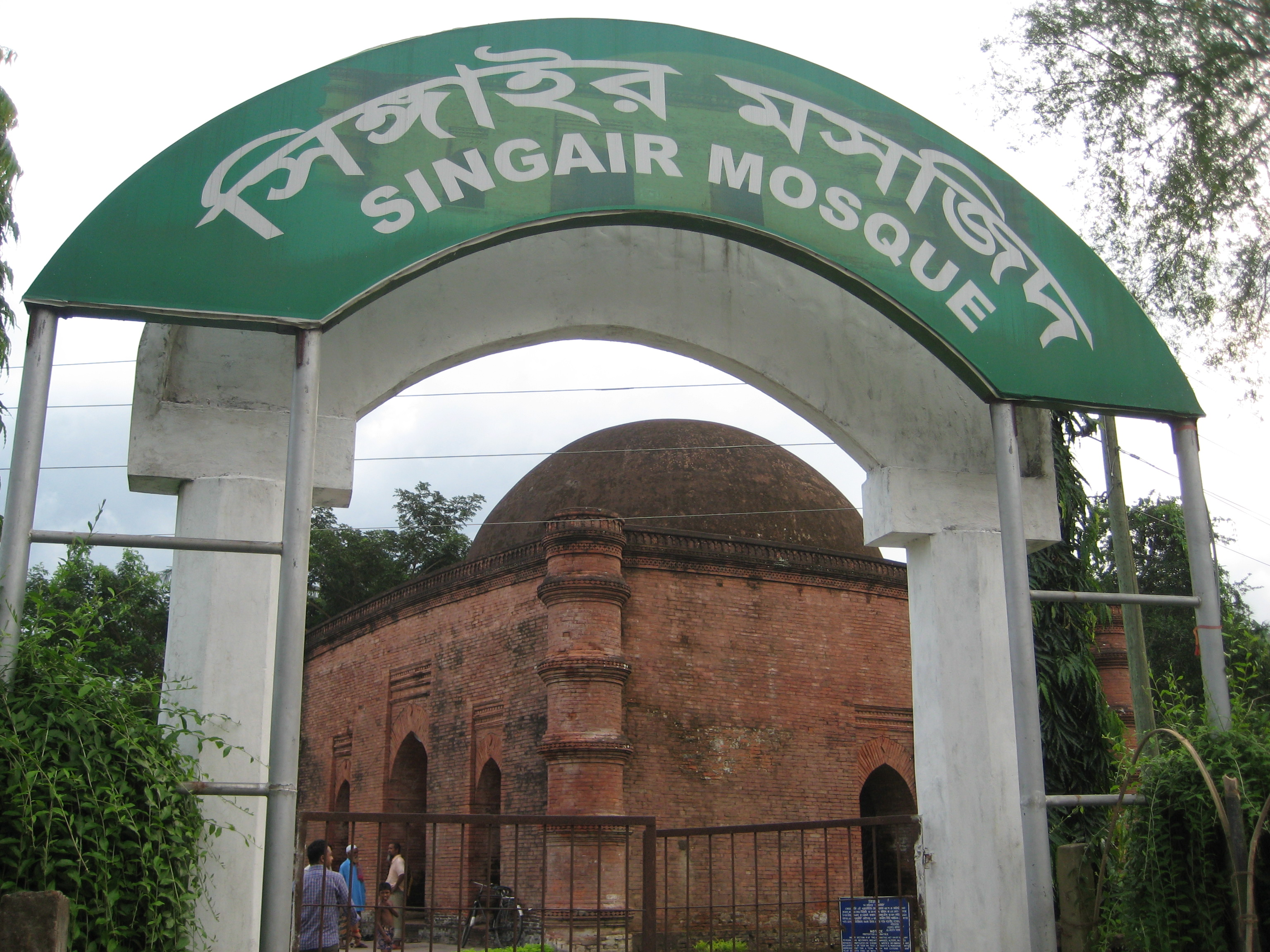
The entrance of the mosque reads "Singair Mosque" (Bengali: সিঙ্গাইর মসজিদ)

== See also ==
- Islam in Bangladesh
- List of mosques in Bangladesh
- List of archaeological sites in Bangladesh
- List of World Heritage Sites in Bangladesh
