= Mosque City of Bagerhat =

UNESCO World Heritage Site in Bagerhat District, Bangladesh

Historic Mosque City of Bagerhat
UNESCO World Heritage Site
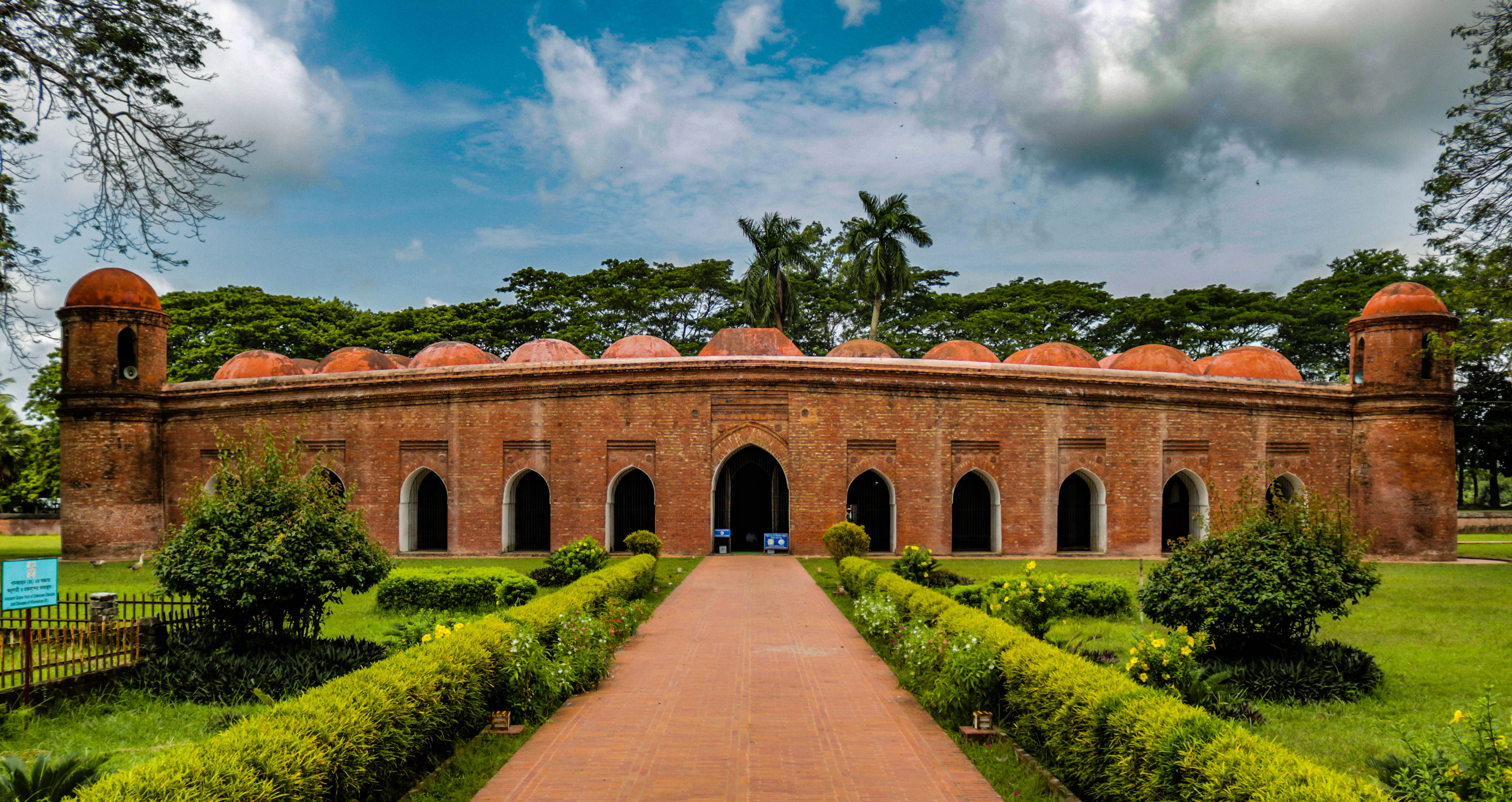
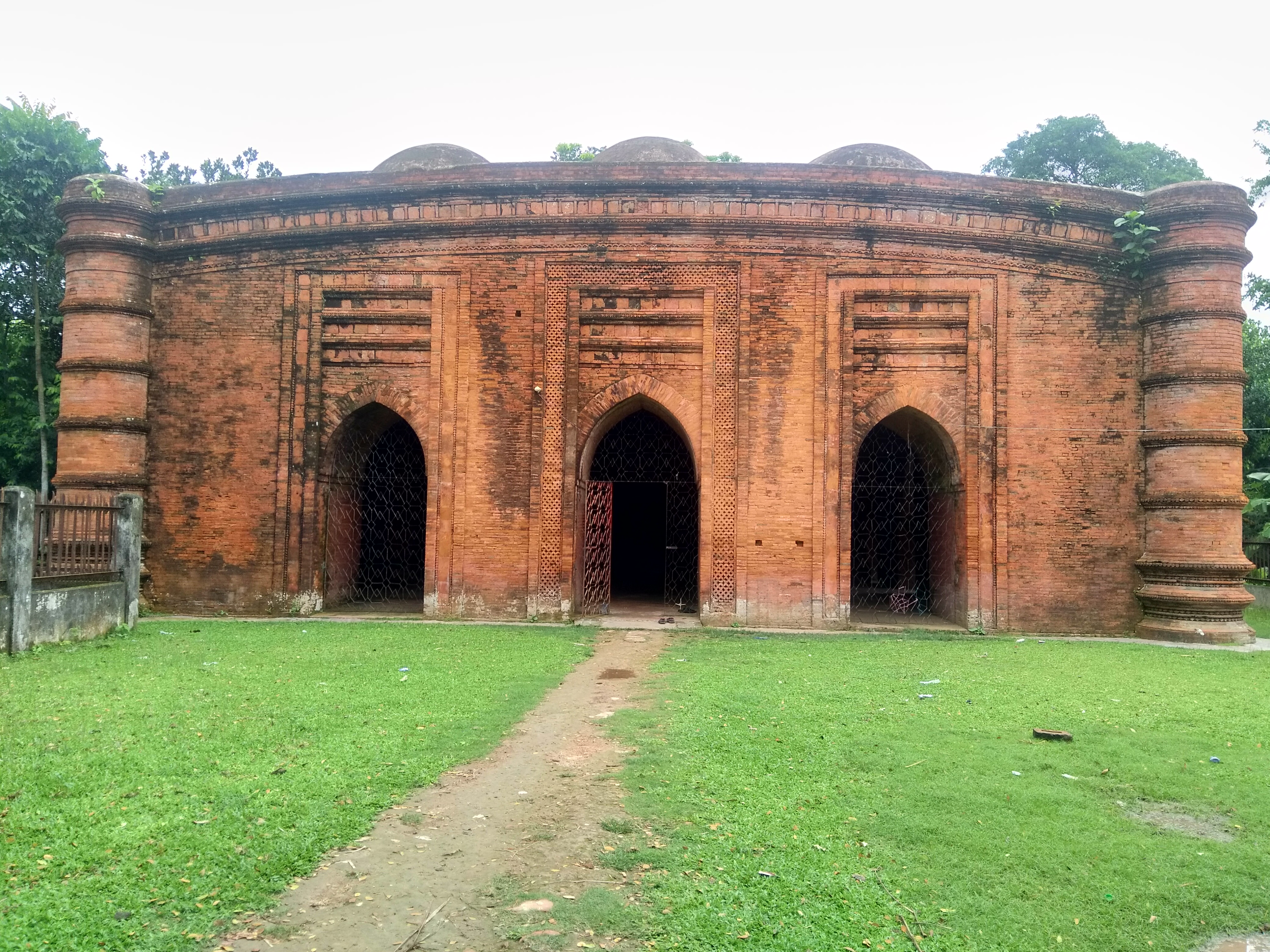
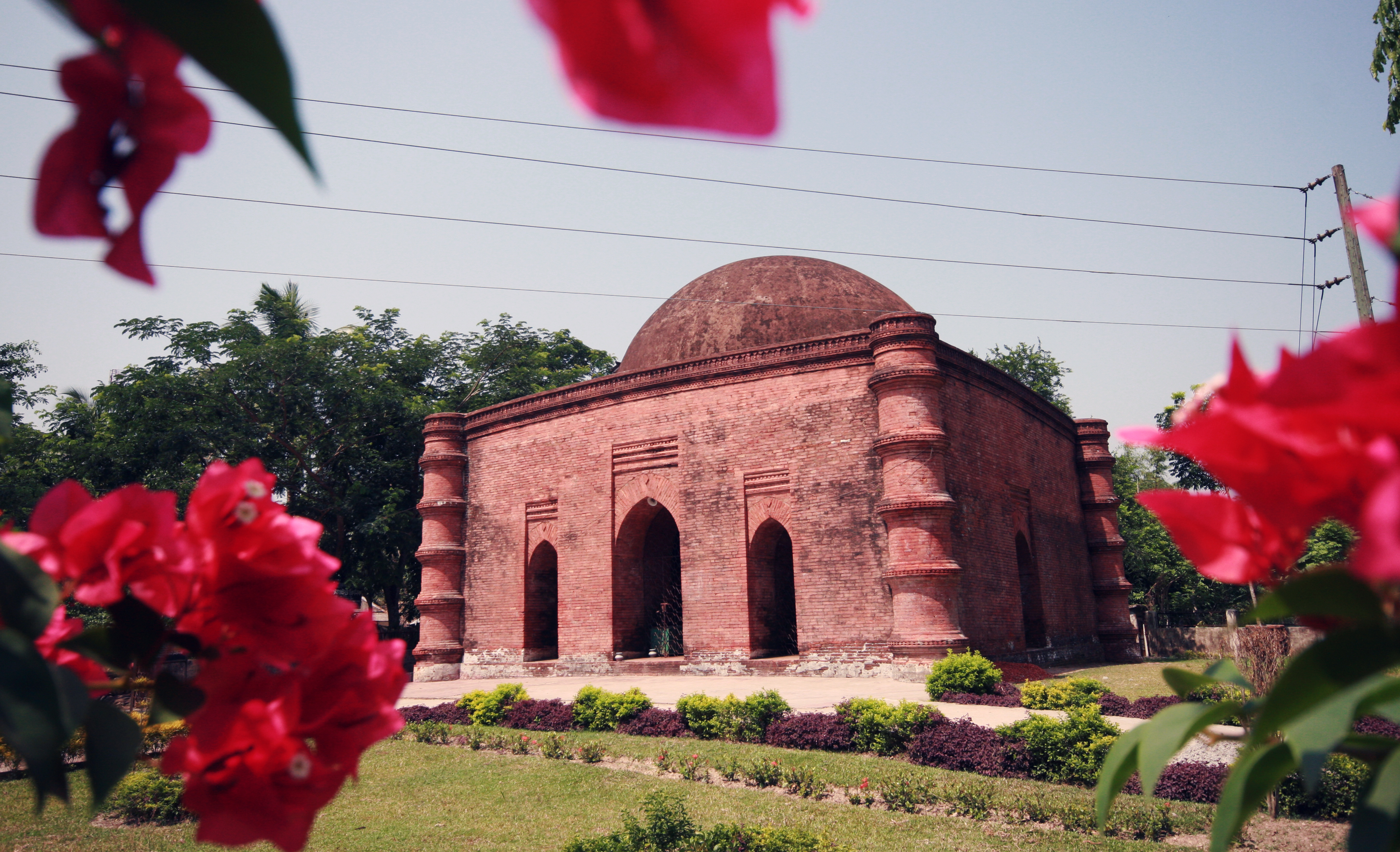
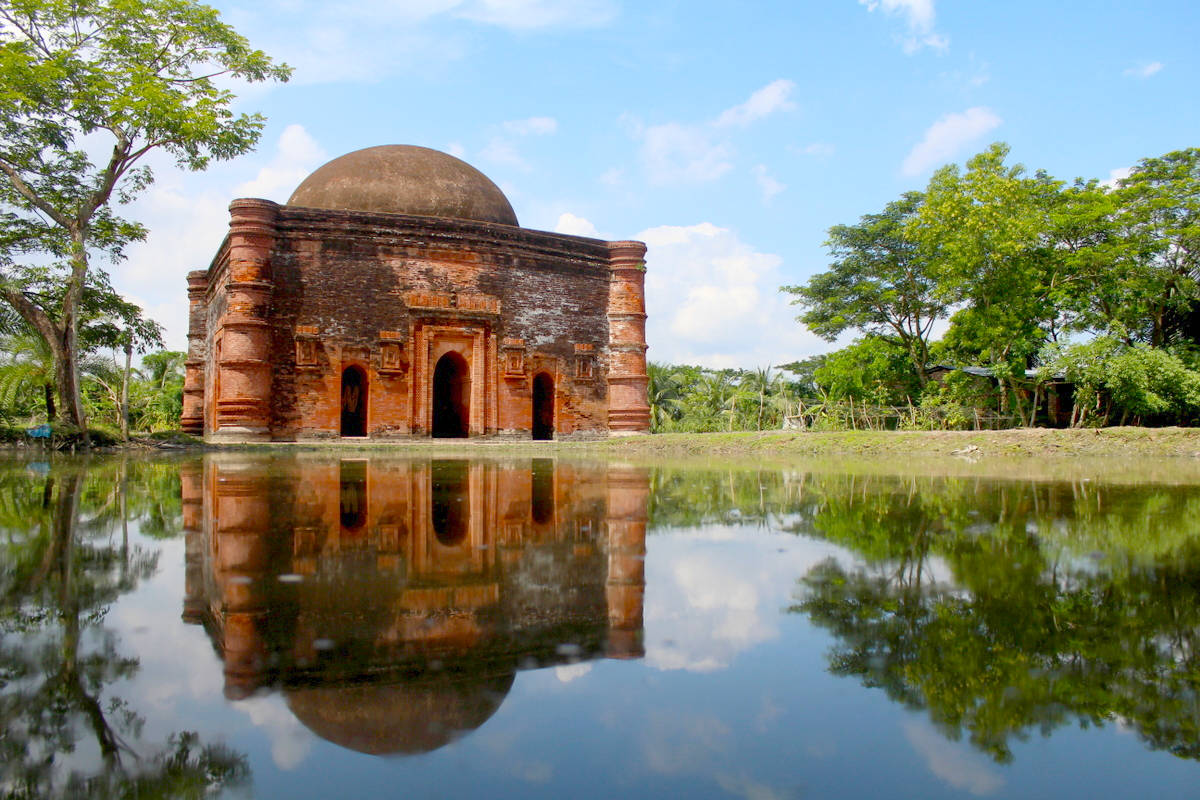
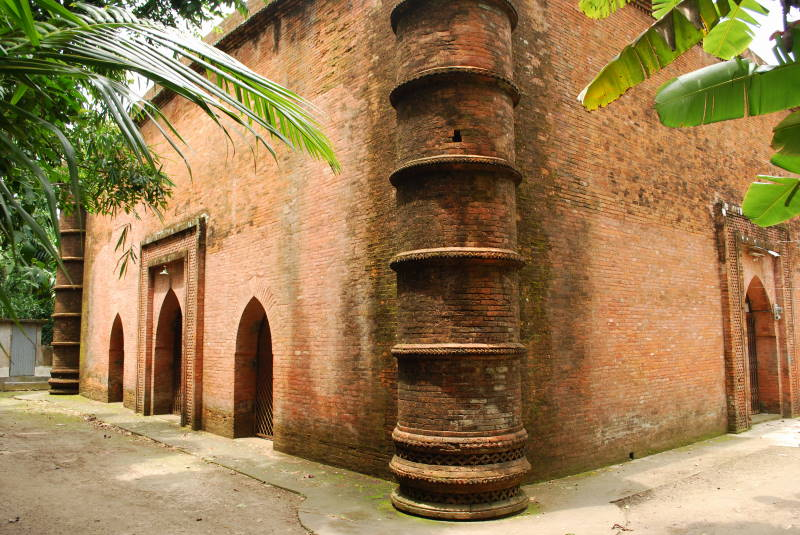
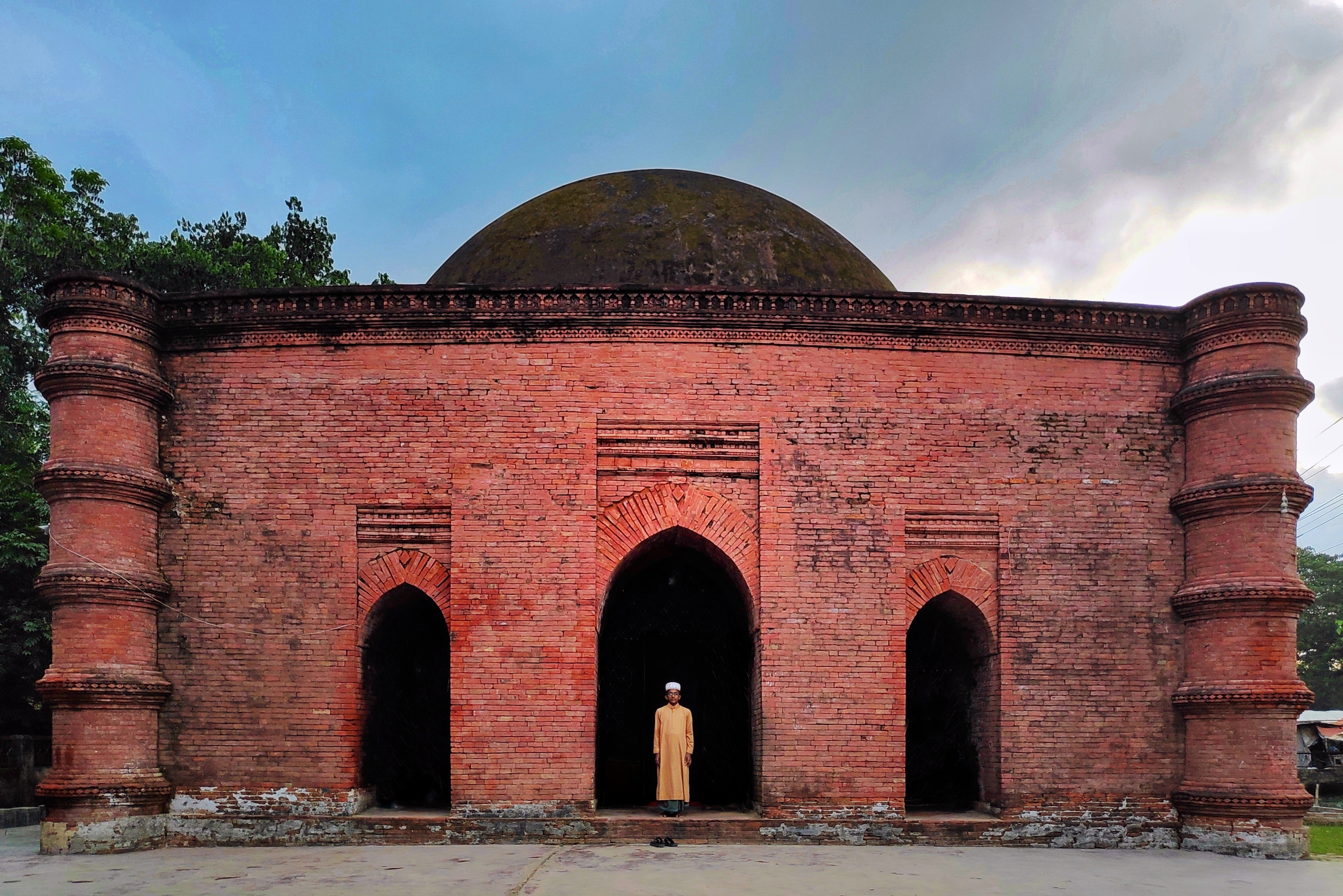
- Clockwise from top: Sixty Dome Mosque, Nine Dome Mosque, Chunakhola Mosque, Ronvijoypur Mosque, Bibi Begni Mosque and Singair Mosque

- Location within Bangladesh
- Location: Bangladesh
- Criteria: Cultural: (iv)
- Reference: 321
- Inscription: 1985 (9th Session)
- Coordinates: 22°39′39.5″N 89°45′30.8″E

The Mosque City of Bagerhat (Bengali: মসজিদের শহর বাগেরহাট, romanized: Môsjider Shôhôr Bagerhat; historically known as Khalifatabad) is a UNESCO World Heritage Site in Bagerhat District, Bangladesh. It contains 360 mosques, public buildings, mausoleums, bridges, roads, water tanks and other public buildings constructed from baked brick. The mosques were built during the Bengal Sultanate in the 15th century, of which the Sixty Dome Mosque is the largest. Other mosques include the Singar Mosque, the Nine Dome Mosque, the Tomb of Khan Jahan, the Bibi Begni Mosque and the Ronvijoypur Mosque. The mosques were built during the governorship of Ulugh Khan Jahan, a Turkic military officer appointed as governor in the Sundarbans by Sultan Mahmud Shah of Bengal.

The site was a "mint town" of the Bengal Sultanate. Bagerhat has one of the largest concentrations of sultanate-era mosques in Bangladesh. The historic city has more than 50 structures built in the local Bengal Sultanate variant style of Indo-Islamic architecture. This is sometimes called the 'Khan Jahan Style'. These were uncovered after removing the vegetation that had obscured them from view for many centuries. The site was inscribed as a UNESCO World Heritage Site in 1983 under Criterion (iv) — “as an outstanding example of an architectural ensemble which illustrates a significant stage in human history” — the most prominent being the Sixty Dome Mosque, which features 60 pillars and 77 domes. The mosques feature terracotta artwork and arabesque.

== Geography ==
The mosque city is situated in southern Bengal near the vast estuary of the Bengal delta. It is located 60 kilometres (37 mi) from the coast of the Bay of Bengal. The city is spread over an area of 50 square kilometres (19 sq mi), on the banks of the moribund branch of the Bhairab River along a 6 kilometres (3.7 mi) stretch (in an east–west direction and about 25 kilometres (16 mi) width in north–south direction), which was part of the Sundarbans mangrove forests. Today all monuments are set in the unspoilt environment of what is now farmlands, surrounded by palm trees.

== History ==
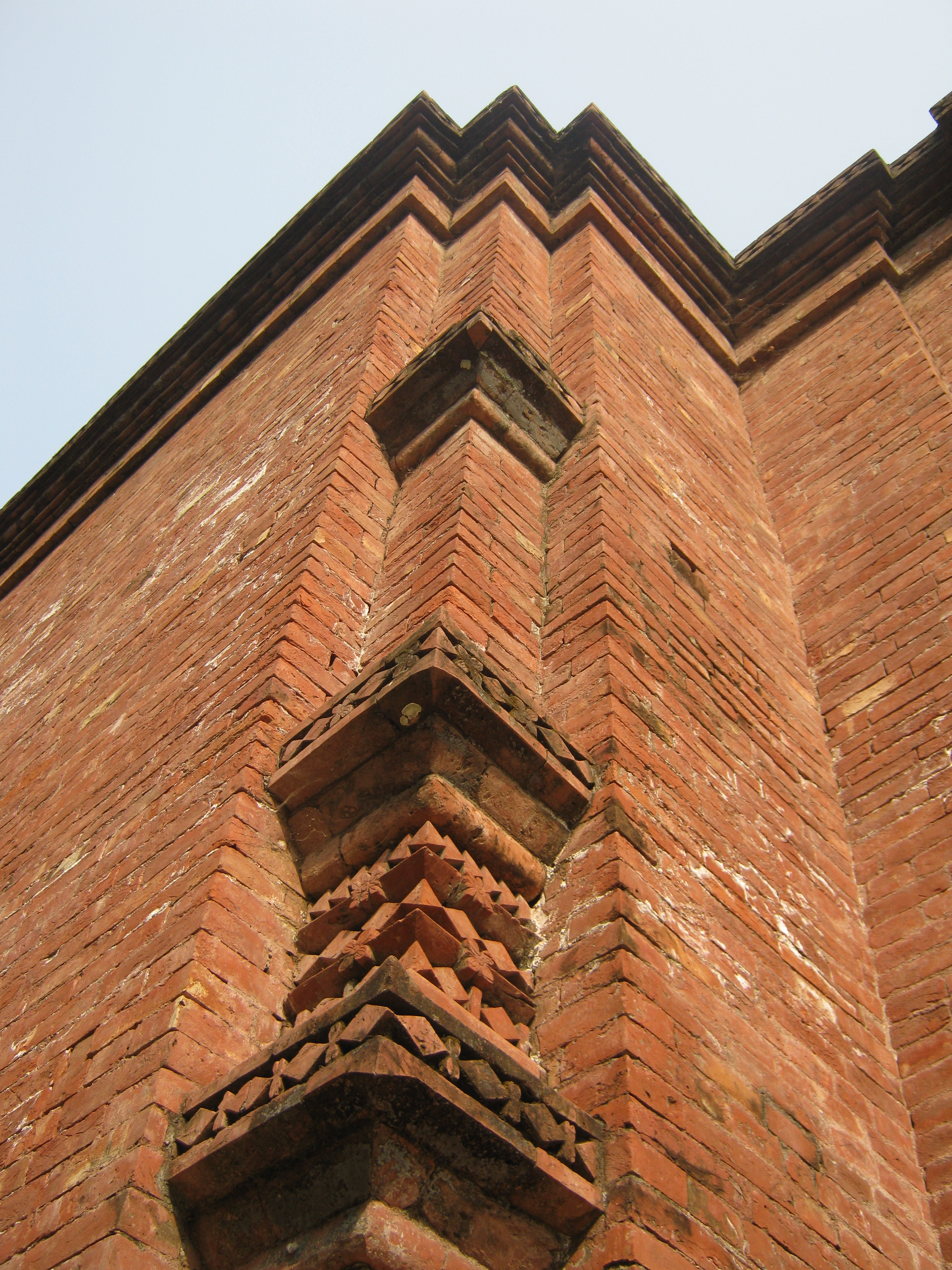
Terrocotta arabesque on a corner wall, Sixty Dome Mosque

The Bengal Sultanate appointed Khan Jahan Ali, also known as Ulug Khan, as its governor in the Sundarbans in southern Bengal during the 15th century. Ulugh Khan Jahan was a person of Turkic-origin. The title of Ulugh was common to rulers from the Turco-Persian tradition. The Bengal Sultanate attracted many immigrants from the Middle East and Central Asia, who brought with them ideas of Islamic architecture. Sufism was employed by Muslim missionaries to attract the local population. The high concentration of mosques suggests the rapidity with which the local population converted to Islam.

According to coin inscriptions of the sultanate taka, it was built in the 15th century and was known by the name of Khalifatabad during the 16th century.

Ulugh Khan Jahan administered an area covering parts of present-day Khulna Division and Barisal Division in Bangladesh. Inscriptions in Bagerhat indicate that the mosque was built during the reign of Sultan Mahmud Shah between 1450 and 1459. Interestingly, Mahmud Shah was also responsible for transferring Bengal's capital from Pandua to Gauda. The reign of Mahmud Shah was marked by significant architectural development. In south Bengal, the mosque city of Bagerhat displays the simplistic 'Khan Jahan Style' of Bengali Islamic architecture. Ulugh Khan Jahan was responsible for establishing a planned township with roads, bridges, and water supply tanks (of which the Ghoradighi and Dargadighi still survive), cisterns, and several mosques and tombs. Ulugh Khan Jahan was a Sufi.

In 1895, an extensive survey of the area was conducted by the Archaeological Survey of British India, and restoration was put into effect in 1903–04 on the Sixty Dome Mosque. In 1907-8 part of the roof and 28 domes were restored. In 1983, UNESCO drew up a master plan for the Bagerhat area and it became a World Heritage Site in 1985.

== Architecture ==
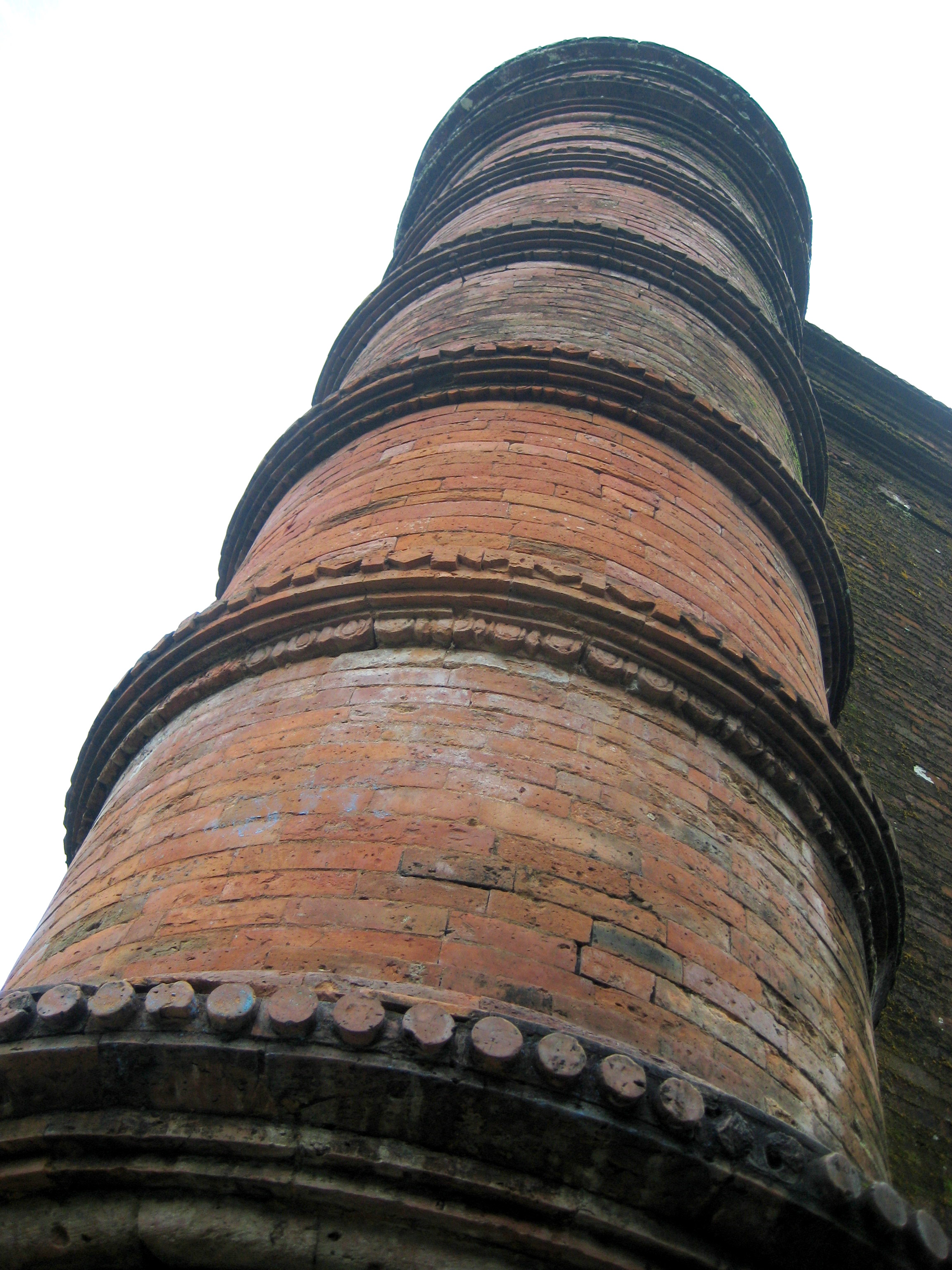
Corner tower, Nine Dome Mosque

The remaining buildings of the city are largely mosques and bridges etc, which later locals did not like to take apart for their materials. Only few of the original houses remain today. The larger buildings use a version of the Bengal Sultanate style of Indo-Islamic architecture, with elements of various styles, including Bengali, Persian and Arab. The city covered 360 mosques (most of them of identical designs) and many public buildings, mausoleums, bridges, network of roads and water reservoirs. The material used in building construction was baked bricks, which over the centuries deteriorated under saline conditions of the soil and the atmosphere.

The mosques have round towers projecting at the four corners; sometimes these extend some way above the main roofline to make minarets at the front corners of the mosque. These are very short by normal standards.

The layout, revealed after the recent removal of the vegetative growth around the historic city, indicates that the city developed in two distinct zones; the main zone is the Mosque of Shait Gumbaz and its precincts and the other zone to its east is the one encircling the Mausoleum of Khan Jahan. The two zones are separated by a distance of 6.5 kilometres (4.0 mi).

== Mosques ==
The following includes a partial list of mosques, tombs or mausoleums and other monuments which have been restored from among the large number of ruins located in the city.

=== Sixty Dome Mosque ===
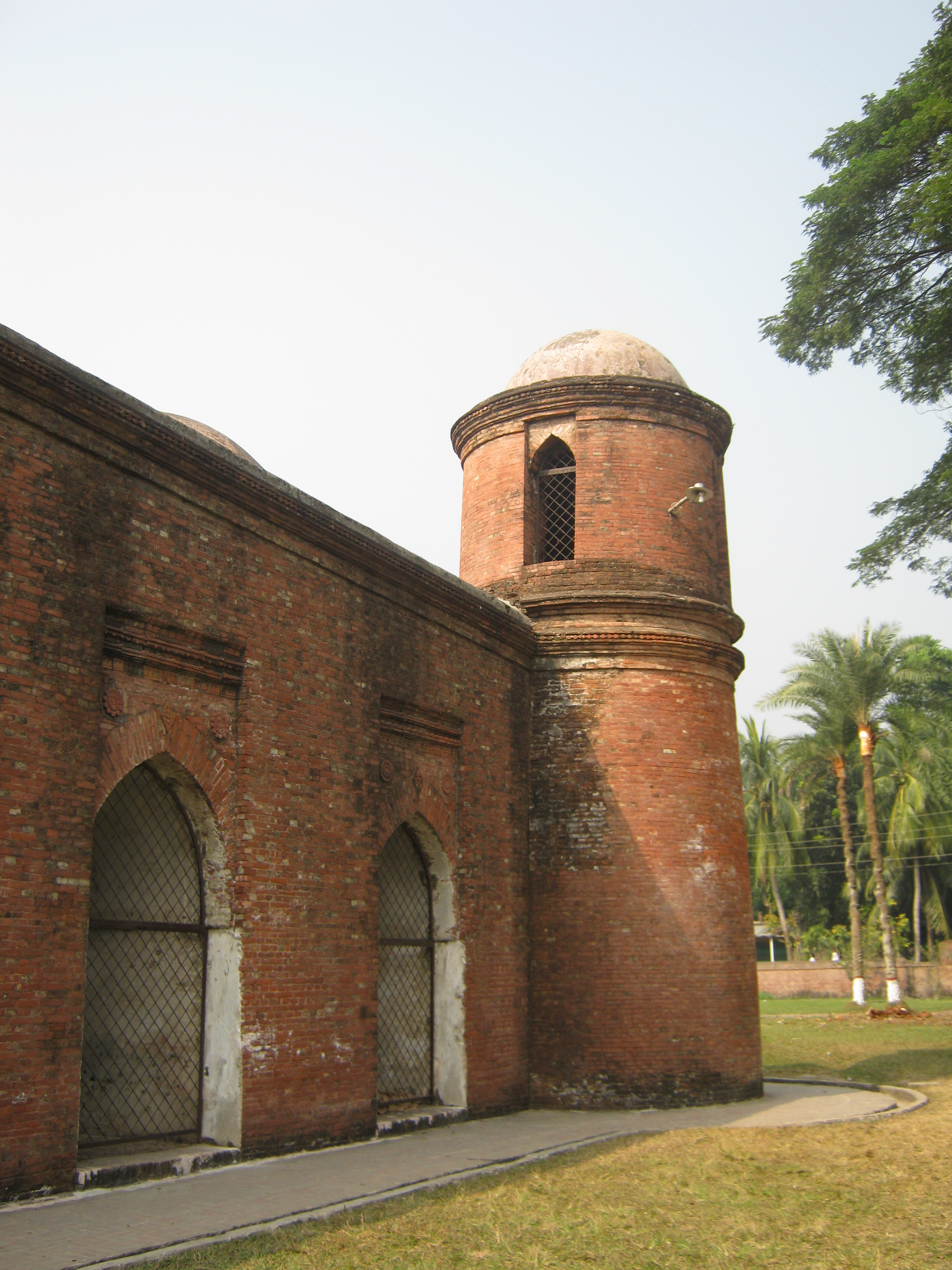
Minaret of the Sixty Dome Mosque

The Sixty Dome Mosque, on the eastern bank of a water tank or pond (the Ghora Dighi), is one of the oldest mosques in the country and is described as a "historic mosque representing the Golden Era of Muslim Bengal". The mosque has an oblong plan of 148'6" x 101'4" externally and 123'3" x 76'2" internally. The mosque is unique in that it has 60 pillars that support 77 exquisitely curved "low squat domes" that have worn away over time; it has seven central domes that are four-sided and built in Bengali style. It was established in 1440 by Khan Jahan Ali.

The minarets are double storied and round in shape; projecting cornices surround the shafts up to the middle height of the minarets and a window fitted at this mid height provides ventilation and light. A spiral staircase in this minar leads to the top.

It was used for prayers, as an assembly hall and madrasa. Seventy seven domes are over the roof and four smaller ones at the four corners are towers (the towers were used to call the faithfuls to attend prayers). The large prayer hall has 11 arched doorways on the east and 7 each on the north and south which provide ventilation and light to the hall. There are 7 longitudinal aisles and 11 deep bays in the midst of slim columns made of stone. These columns support the curving arches that are overlaid by the domes. The west wall in the interior has eleven mihrabs that are decorated with stonework and terracotta and the flooring is brickwork. The walls and the mihrabs were affected by sulphates. Most of the damage has been rectified. The arches are 6 feet (1.8 m) thick with a slight taper over the hollow and round walls. The mosque also functioned as the court of Khan Jahan Ali. It now attracts a large number of tourists and visitors. The mosque is decorated mostly with terracotta and bricks.

=== Nine Dome Mosque ===
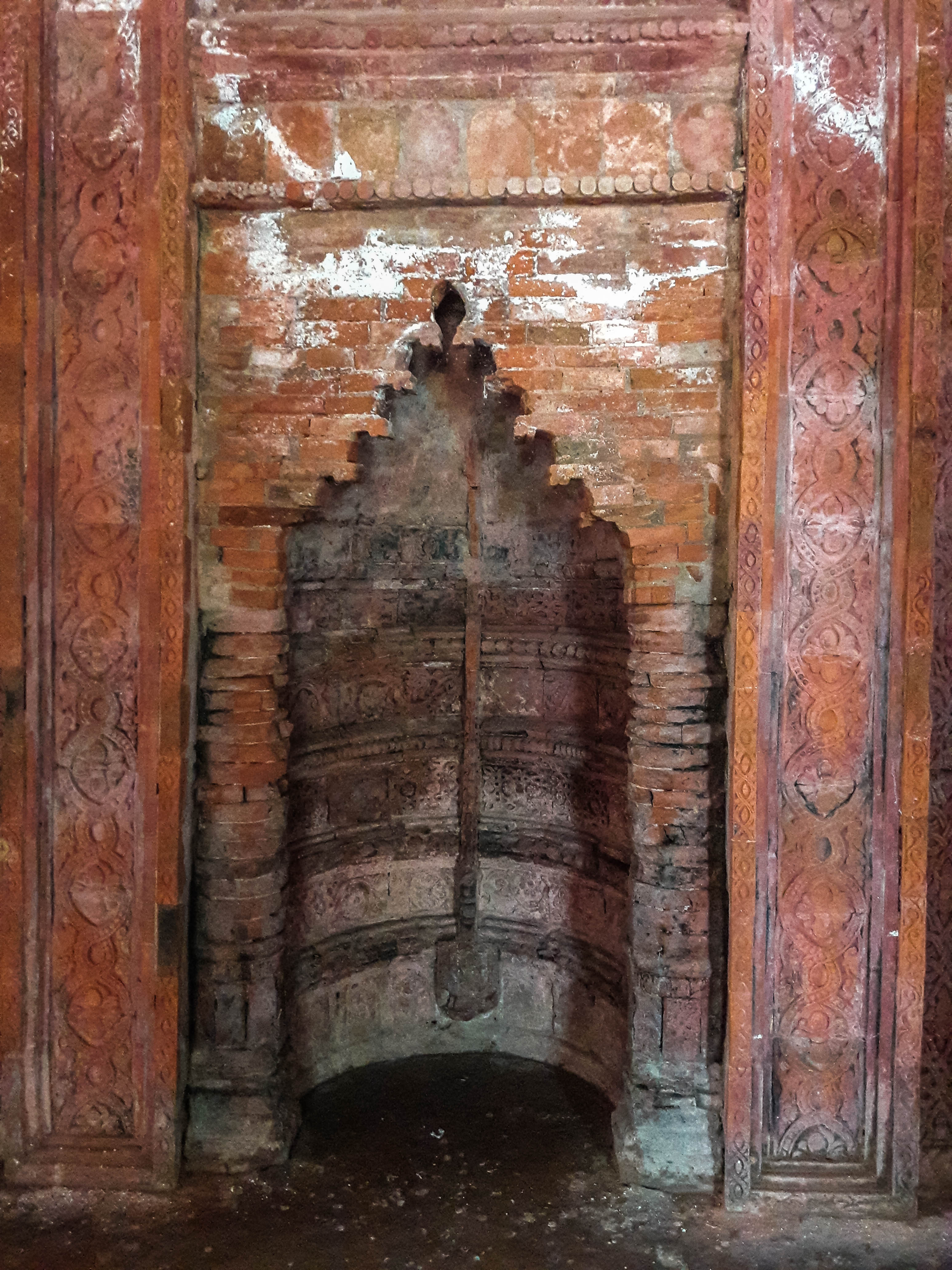
Mihrab of the Nine Dome Mosque

The Nine Dome Mosque is located to the west of the takur dighi tank and built in the 15th century. It is located near Khan Jahan Ali's tomb. Its western wall conventionally faces west towards Mecca, where the mihrab is inset; terracotta floral scrolls and flower motifs are the decorations seen around the mihrab. Circular towers are provided in the four corners. The walls of the mosque support a large central dome which has eight smaller domes around it. This structure was also affected by sulphates. It has been since substantially restored. Close to this mosque are the Zinda Pir Mosque and mazar (tomb), which are in ruins.

=== Singair Mosque ===
The Singair Mosque is across the road from the Sixty Dome Mosque on its southeastern side. It is a square shaped single dome mosque. In what is typical to the Khan Jahan Style, the dome is supported on thick walls and topped with a cambered cornice. The Bigi Begni Mosque and the Chuna Khola Mosque are also single domed but much larger in size.

=== Ronvijoypur Mosque ===
The Ronvijoypur Mosque has the largest dome in Bangladesh. It is of 11 metres (36 ft) width supported by arches and pendentives. The corners have tapering circular turrets while the external cornice has a slight curve. The mosque's interior is plain. However, the main mihrabs have decorations of floral patterns. It is located on the opposite side of the Khan Jahan Tomb on the Khulna-Bagerhat Road. It was built in the Khan Jahan style of architecture. It has been renovated many times in the past during the 1960s and 70s. However, it needs further repair work to prevent dampness inside the tomb, and also to the brickwork on the exterior surfaces.

=== Chunakhola Mosque ===
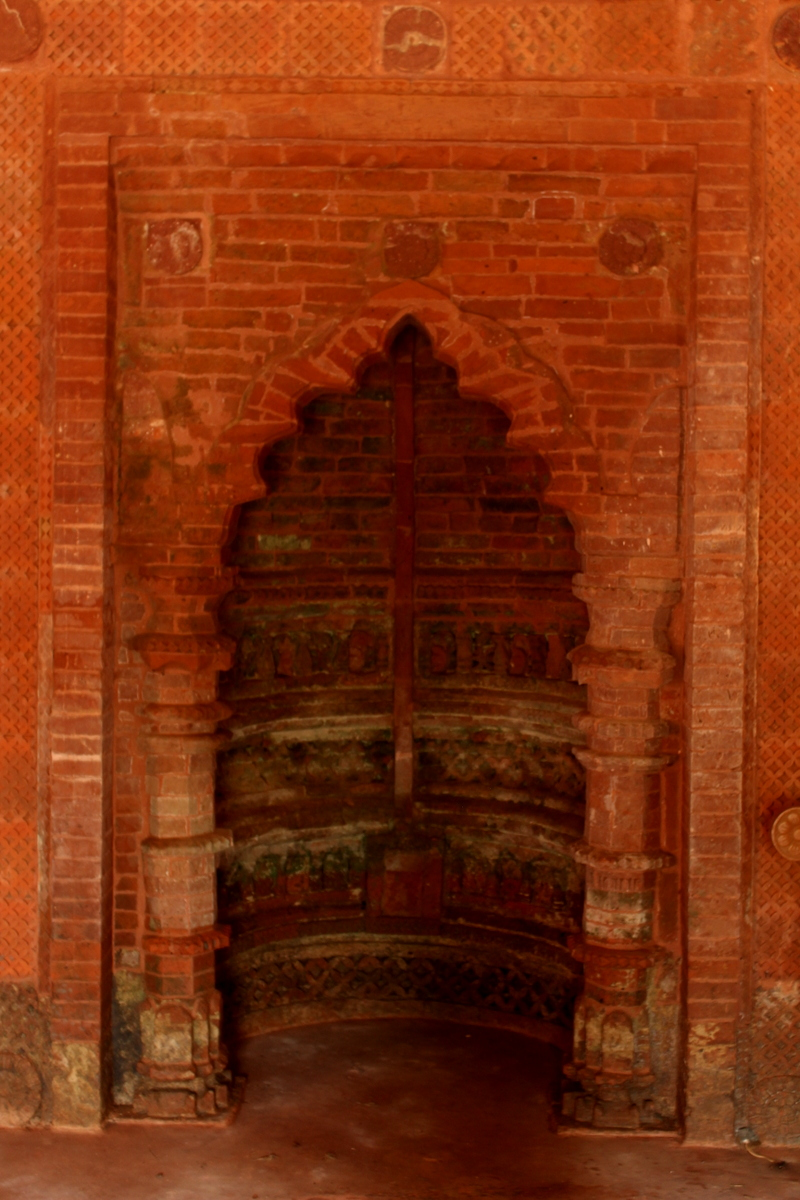
Mihrab in Chunakhola Mosque

The Chunakhola Mosque, built in the 15th century, is located in the midst of rice fields in the village of Chuna Khola (named after the limestone extraction that was in vogue here in the past). It has been identified as representing a transition from the Khan Jahan style monuments. It is a 7.7 metres (25 ft) square building with 2.24 metres (7 ft 4 in) thick walls. It has three entrances on the east and one each on the northern and southern sides also. It has three mihrabs with the central mihrab being the largest in size and projecting outwards. It has a hemispherical dome with frontal arches. There are also squinches and half domes. It is distinctly different from the Khan Jahan style mosque in its exterior decorations, particularly the east façade, which depicts four rectangular panels bordered by foliated scrolls with merlons having plant motifs. It has four turrets with curved cornices. The brick walls, in particular, were damaged due to sulphate effect. It was renovated in the 1980s according to guidelines set by UNESCO.

=== Tomb of Khan Jahan Ali ===
The Khan Jahan Mausoleum or tomb is located on the northern bank of a water tank (a pond infested with crocodiles) called thakur dighi in Bengali language. The pond is square in shape and the excavated material from the tank was used to make an embankment over which the Mausoleum has been built. The pond is approached through a flight of broad and steep steps built from the embankment. It has a single dome structure built over a square plan of 47'0" x 47'0" externally while internally it has a square plan of 28'2" x 28'2". The building was made of brick walls over five layers of dressed stone which forms the basement. From recorded sources of 1866, it is also mentioned that the flooring had been inlaid with hexagonal encaustic tiles of different designs and colours (mostly blue, white and yellow). However, in its present condition such type of tiles are seen only on a few steps on the Mausoleum itself. The tomb has black stones which have been used for building the tomb and it is made of three steps. Verses from the Koran are inscribed in Arabic and Persian. There are inscriptions on the walls of the crypt which are inferred as providing historical information about Ulugh Khan Jahan's life. After retirement, Khan Jahan spent his retired life here and after his death on 25 October 1459, his tomb was preserved here. It is now a pilgrimage site where people pay homage to the man who dedicated his lifetime to building the city and its monuments. The Pir Ali Tomb (of Pir Ali, a close associate of Khan Jahan) is an annexe building to this mausoleum and is of identical layout. A mosque called the Dargha Mosque is attached to the mausoleum.

== Museum ==
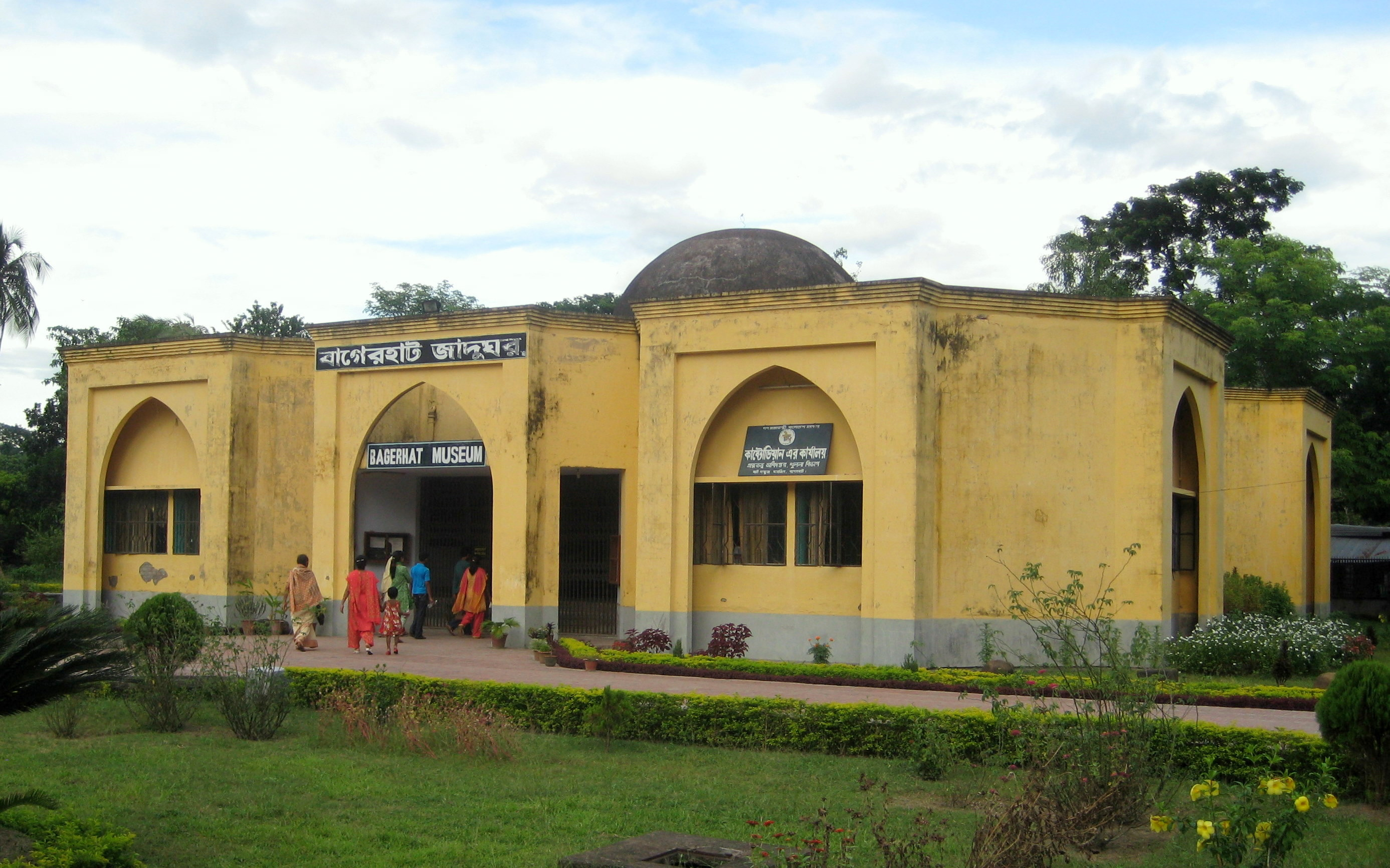
Bagerhat Museum

A small museum has been established by the Directorate of Archaeology of Bangladesh, in collaboration with UNESCO, in front of the Shait Gumbaz Mosque, where antiquaries collected from the area of the historical site are displayed providing knowledge on the history of Bagerhat. It has three exhibit galleries of antiquaries related to the "Historic Mosque City of Bagerhat", which include inscriptions, potteries, terracotta plaques and ornamental bricks. Pictures of important historic buildings of Bangladesh are also part of the exhibits here.

== See also ==
- Architecture of Bangladesh
