= Nine Dome Mosque =

Mosque in Bagerhat, Bangladesh

- নয়গম্বুজ মসজিদ
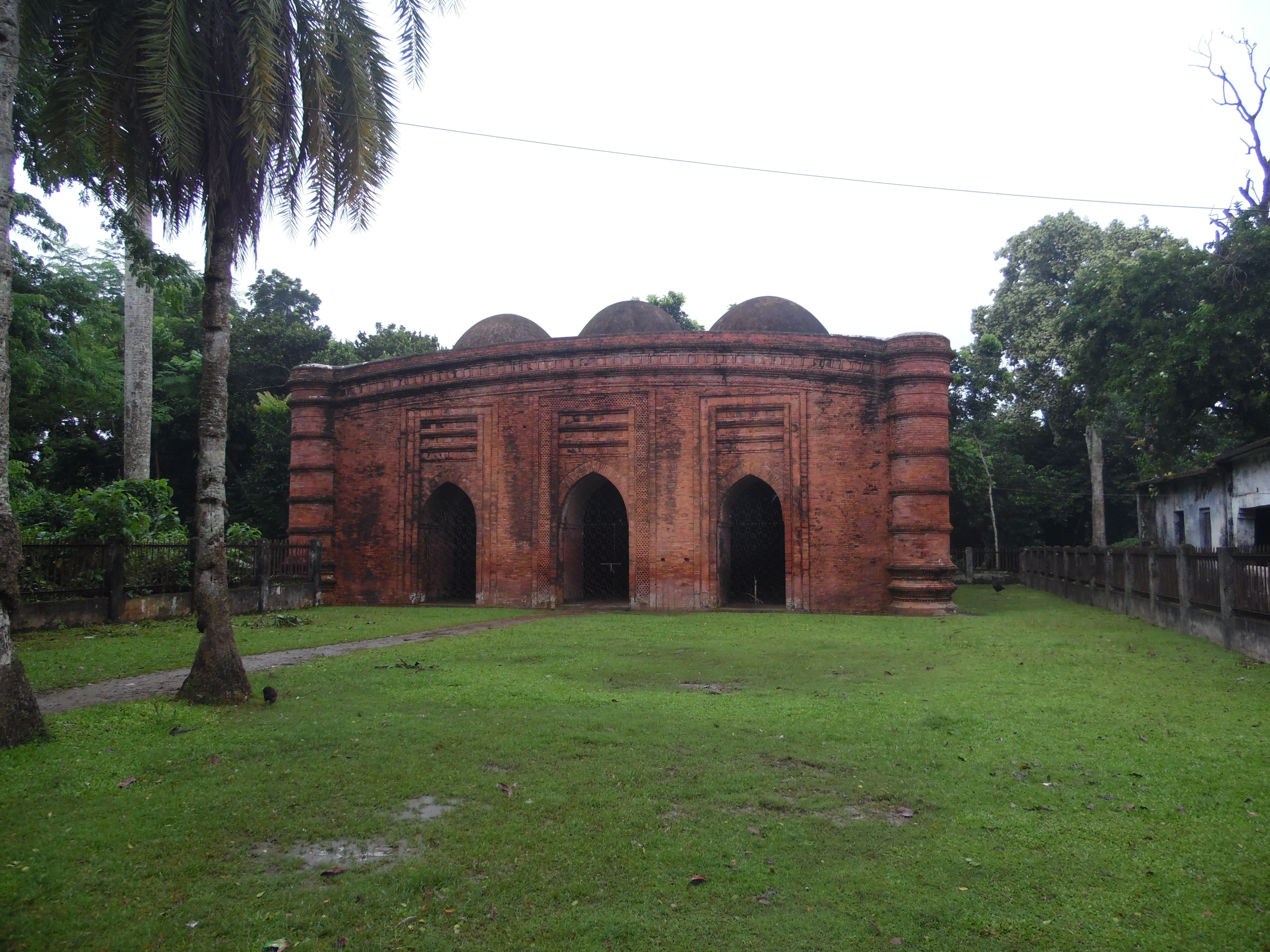
- The mosque in 2017

- Location of the mosque in Bangladesh

Religion
- Affiliation: Sunni Islam
- Ecclesiastical or organisational status: Mosque
- Status: Active

Location
- Location: Bagerhat, Bagerhat District, Khulna Division
- Country: Bangladesh
- Coordinates: 22°39′31″N 89°45′19″E

Architecture
- Type: Mosque architecture
- Style: Bengal Sultanate
- Completed: 15th century

Specifications
- Direction of façade: West
- Dome: Nine

The Nine Dome Mosque (Bengali: নয়গম্বুজ মসজিদ) is an historic Sunni mosque in the Mosque City of Bagerhat in the Khulna Division of Bangladesh. It was built during the governorship of Khan Jahan Ali in the 15th century, under the reign of the Bengal Sultanate.

The Nine Dome Mosque is located to the west of the takur dighi tank and was built in the 15th century; it is close to Khan Jahan Ali's Tomb. Its western wall conventionally faces west towards Mecca. Close to this mosque are the Zinda Pir Mosque and mazar (tomb), which are in ruins.

== Decoration ==
The mosque is close to Khan Jahan Ali's Tomb. Its western wall conventionally faces west towards Mecca, where the mihrab is inset on the western wall; terra cotta floral scrolls and flower motifs are the decorations seen around the mihrab. Circular towers are provided in the four corners. The walls of the mosque support a large central dome which has eight smaller domes around it. The structure was affected by sulphates and has since been substantially restored.

== See also ==
- Islam in Bangladesh
- List of mosques in Bangladesh
- List of archaeological sites in Bangladesh
