= Chunakhola Mosque =

Historical mosque in Bagerhat, Bangladesh

- চুনাখোলা মসজিদ
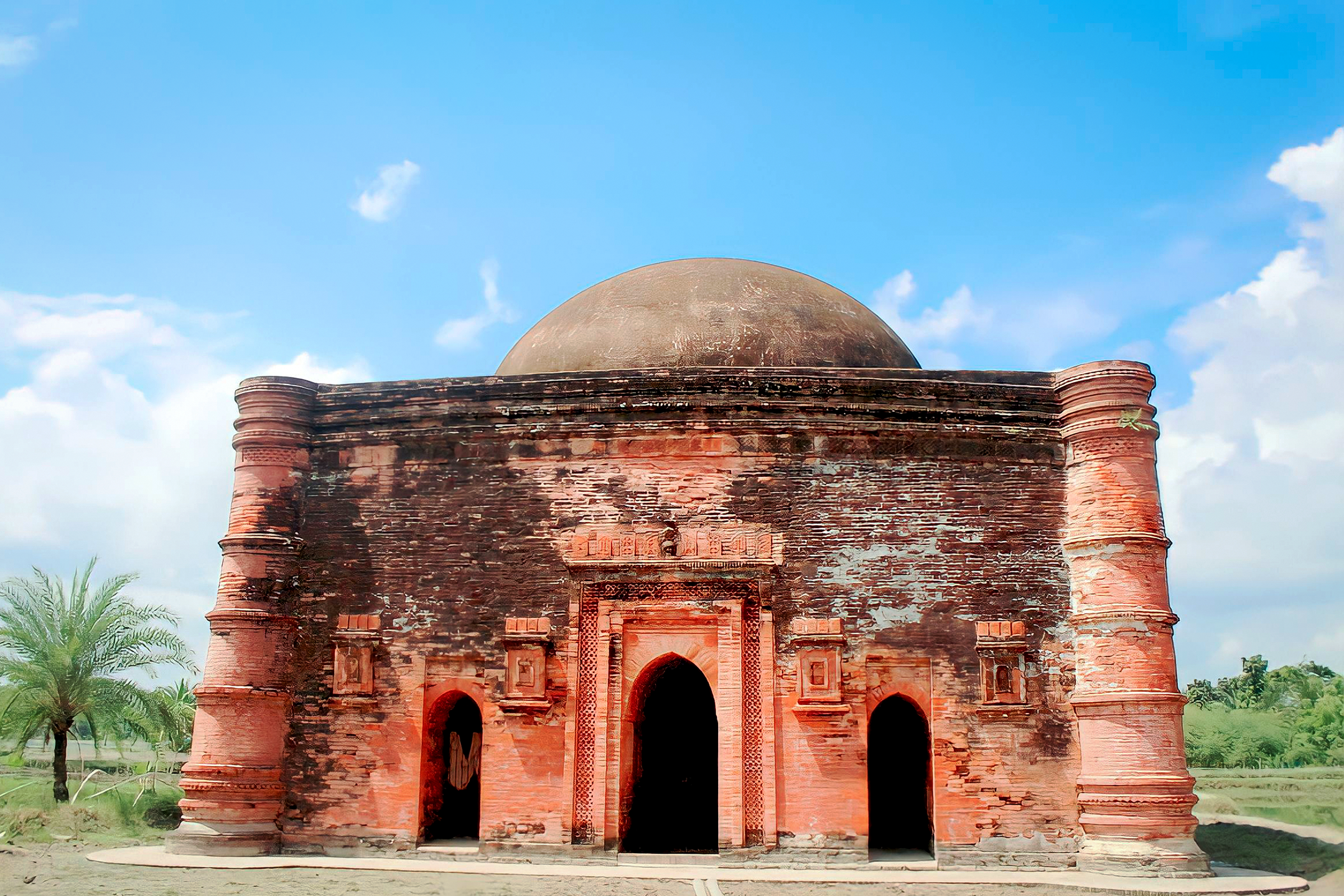

- Location within Bangladesh

Religion
- Affiliation: Islam
- Status: Active

Location
- Location: Chunakhola, Bagerhat District, Khulna Division
- Country: Bangladesh
- Administration: Department of Archeology
- Coordinates: 22.678598°N 89.732139°E

Architecture
- Type: Mosque architecture
- Style: Bengal Sultanate
- Established: Late 15th century

Specifications
- Interior area: 7.70 m^{2} (82.9 ft^{2})
- Dome: 1
- Materials: Brick

Chunakhola Mosque (Bengali: চুনাখোলা মসজিদ) is a historical fifteenth century single domed mosque located in the middle of rice fields in the village of Chunakhola, Bagerhat District. The Sultanate era mosque represents a transitional phase in architectural style, moving from the pure Khan Jahan style to the characteristics observed in later monuments, such as the Zinda Pir Mosque. The mosque was declared a historical monument in 1975. In 1983, UNESCO included the mosque as a “World Cultural Heritage”.

== Architecture ==
The mosque, restored and protected by the Department of Archaeology and Museums, is constructed from brick and measures 7.70 m (25.3 ft) square internally, with walls 2.24 m (7.3 ft) thick which indicates the outside measurement of 12.50 m (41.0 ft) square a side.

The structure features a square plan with three entrances on the eastern facade, the central one measuring 1.33 m (4.4 ft) wide and the flanking entrances 87 centimeters wide. Single entrances, each 1.51 m (5.0 ft) wide, are located on the northern and southern sides. Four circular engaged towers are positioned at the corners of the building.

The western wall of the mosque features three mihrabs, with the central one being the largest. The hemispherical dome is supported by squinches with half-domes and broad frontal arches. Notably, arches above the rectangular frame of the central mihrab and the north and south entrances, which would typically align with the squinches' frontal arches, are absent. The mihrabs are semicircular, adorned with half-domes and cusped arches. Two small trefoil-arched niches are present on the northern and southern walls. The cornice exhibits a gentle curve, featuring three rows of mouldings. Below the lowest moulding, a decorative band displays varied mesh patterns, distinct from other mosques in the Khan Jahan style. The cornice mouldings extend around the corner towers.

The structure is decorated only with terracotta depicting varieties of designs such as jali work, rosettes, floral scrolls, interlocking circles, lozenges and conventional hanging motifs.

== Gallery ==
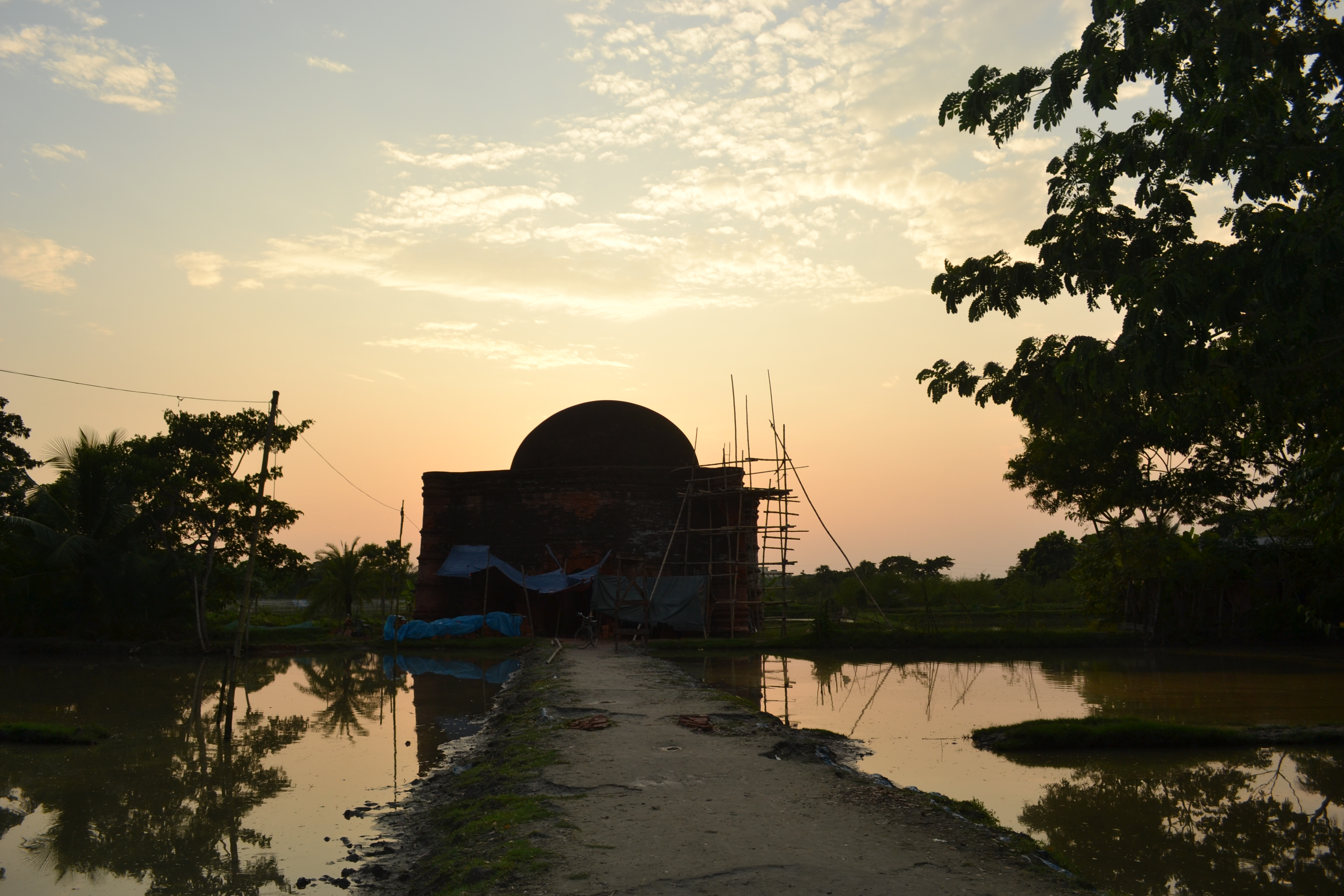
Chunakhola Mosque in sunset

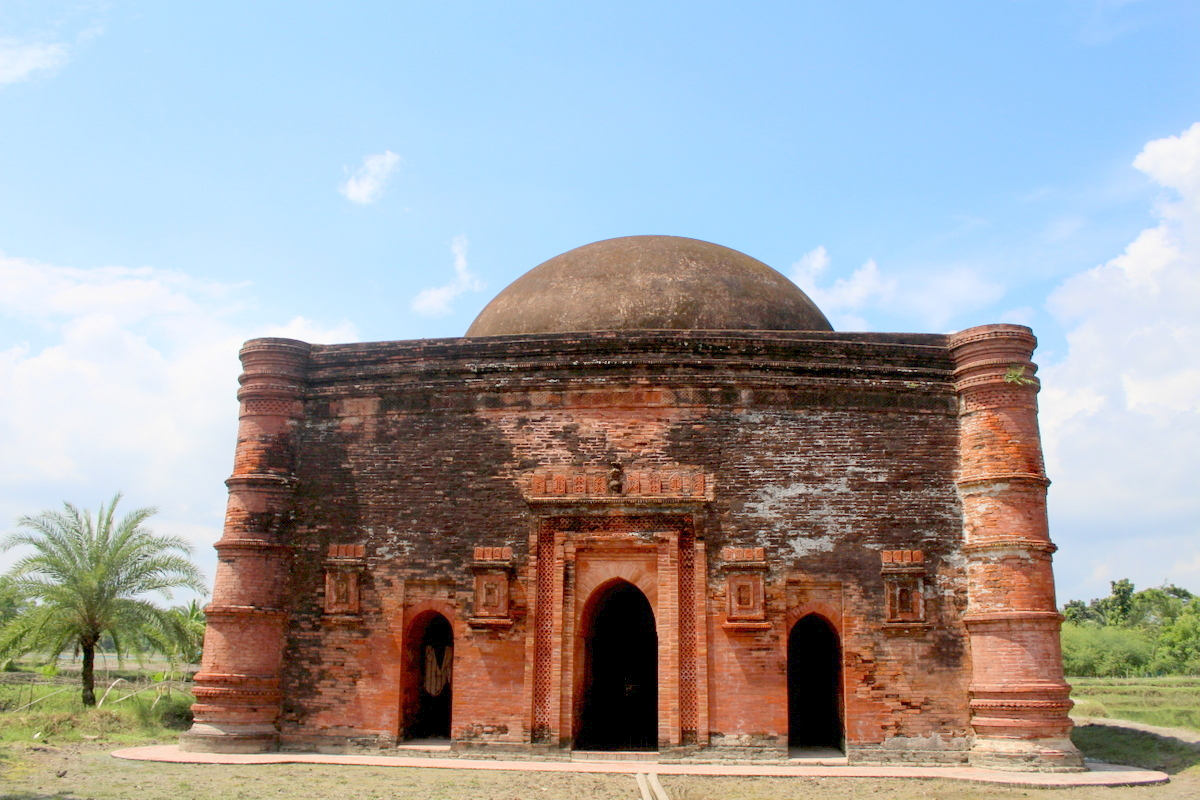
Facade of the mosque

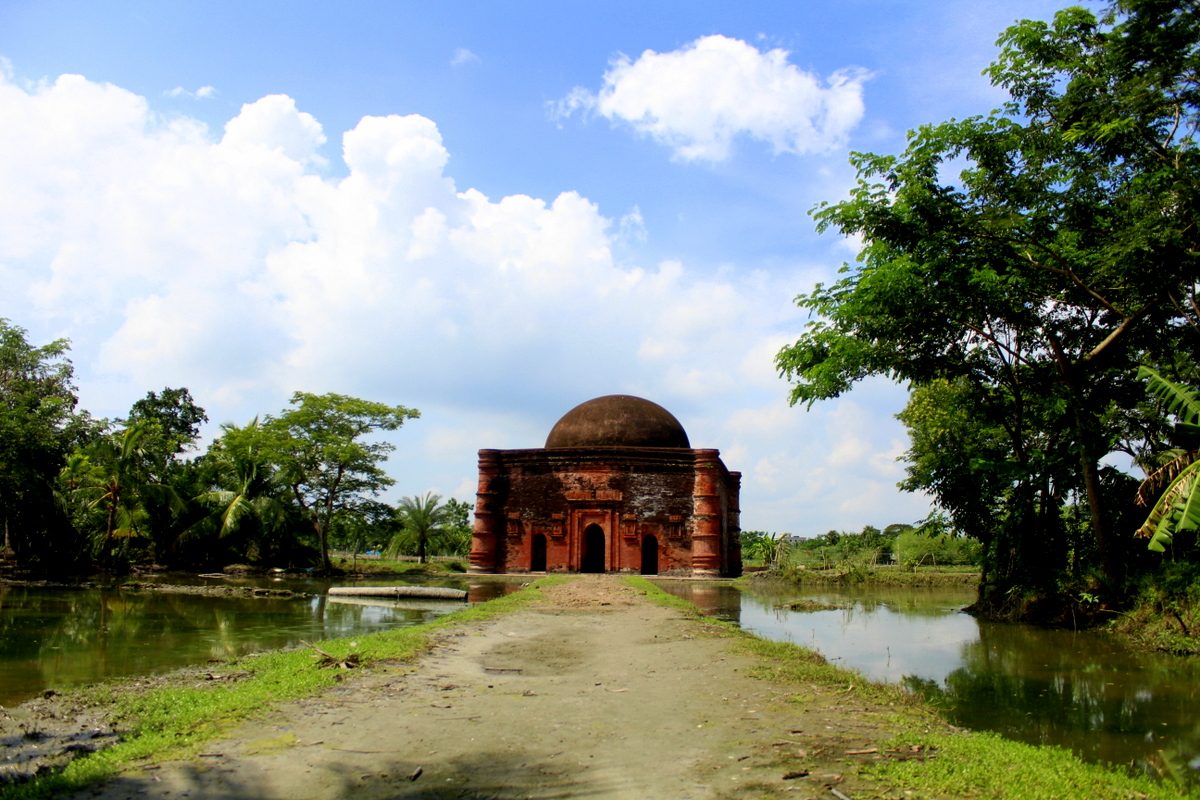
Mosque surrounded by paddy field

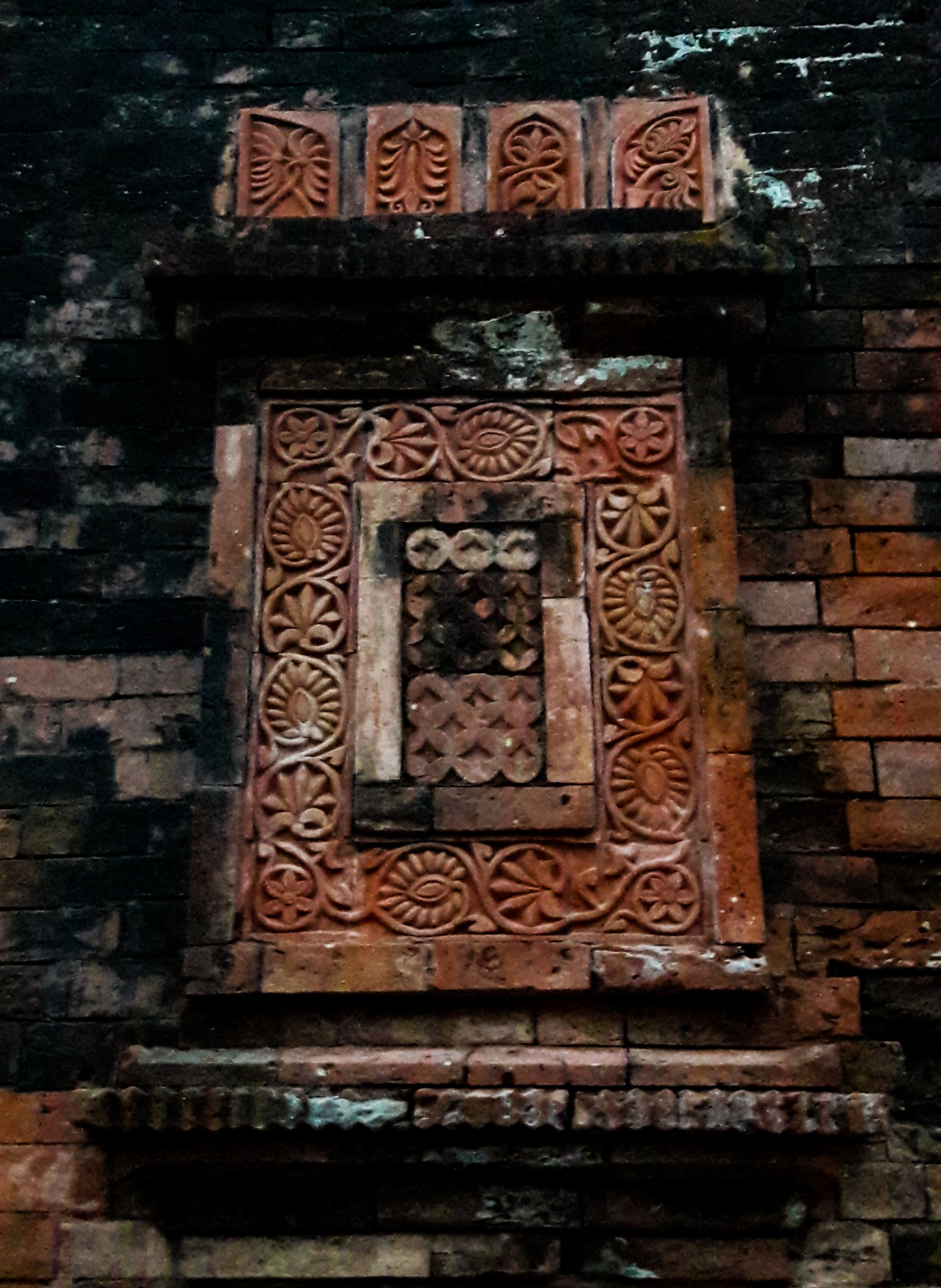
Designs on the wall

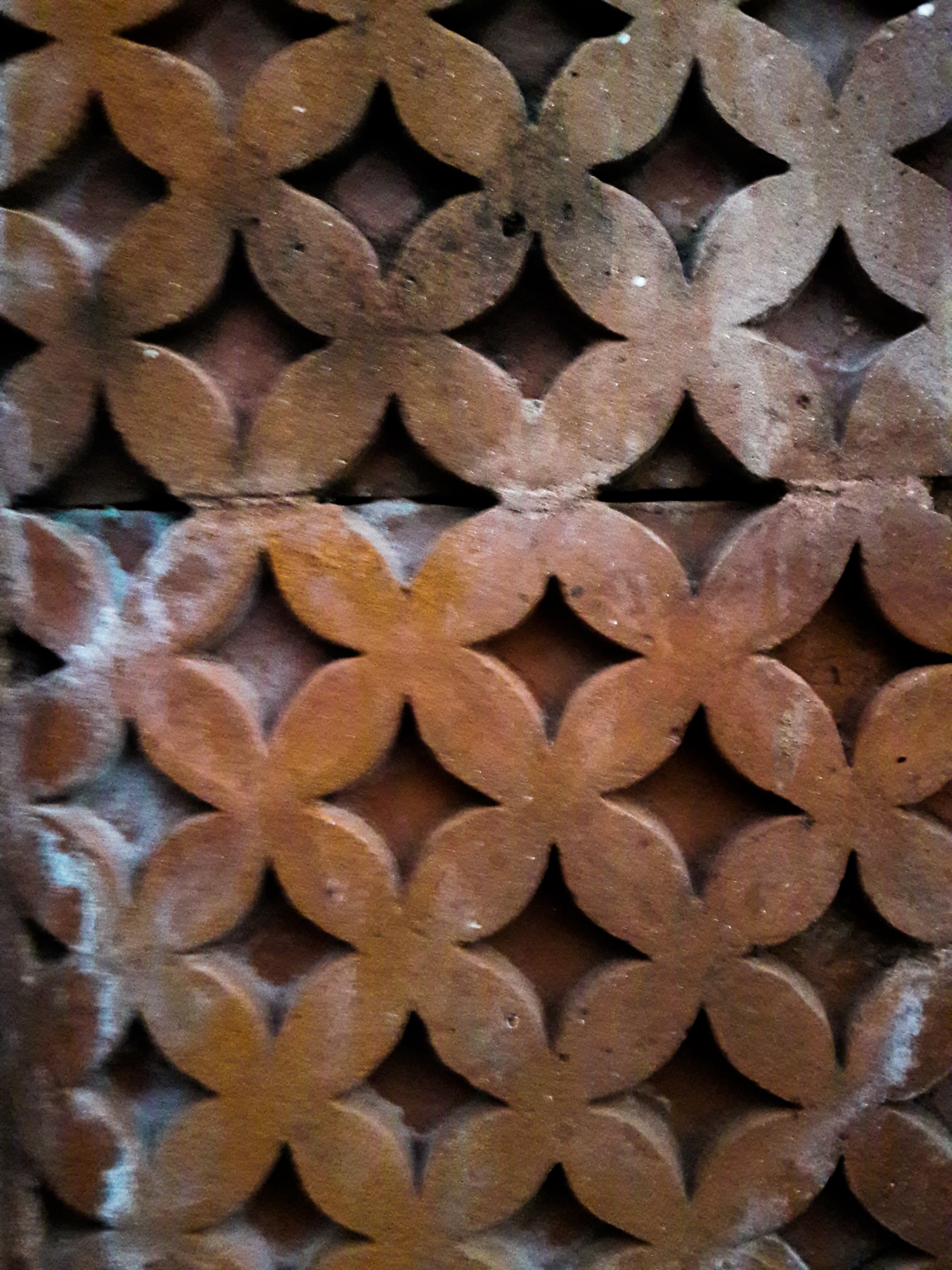

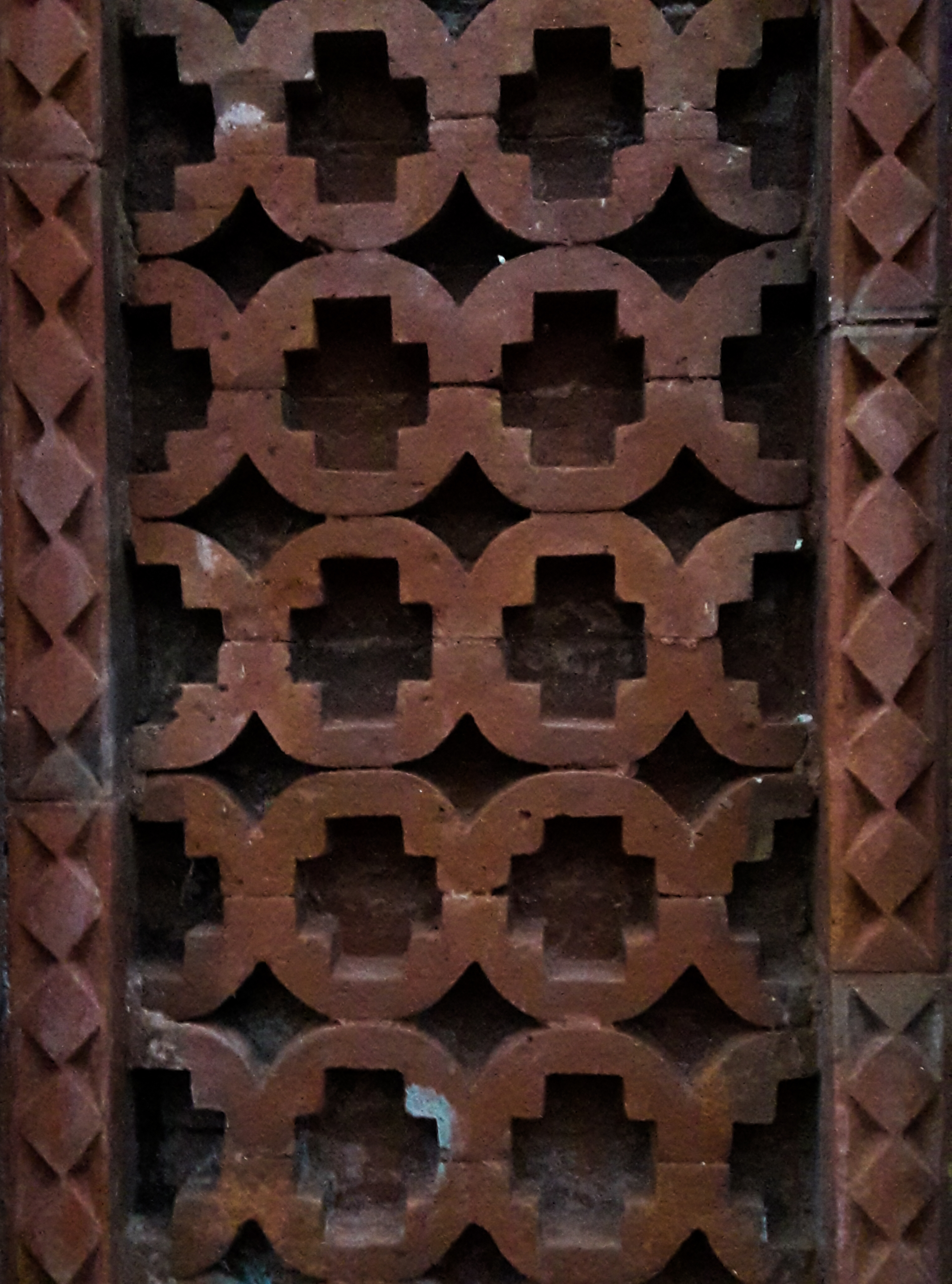

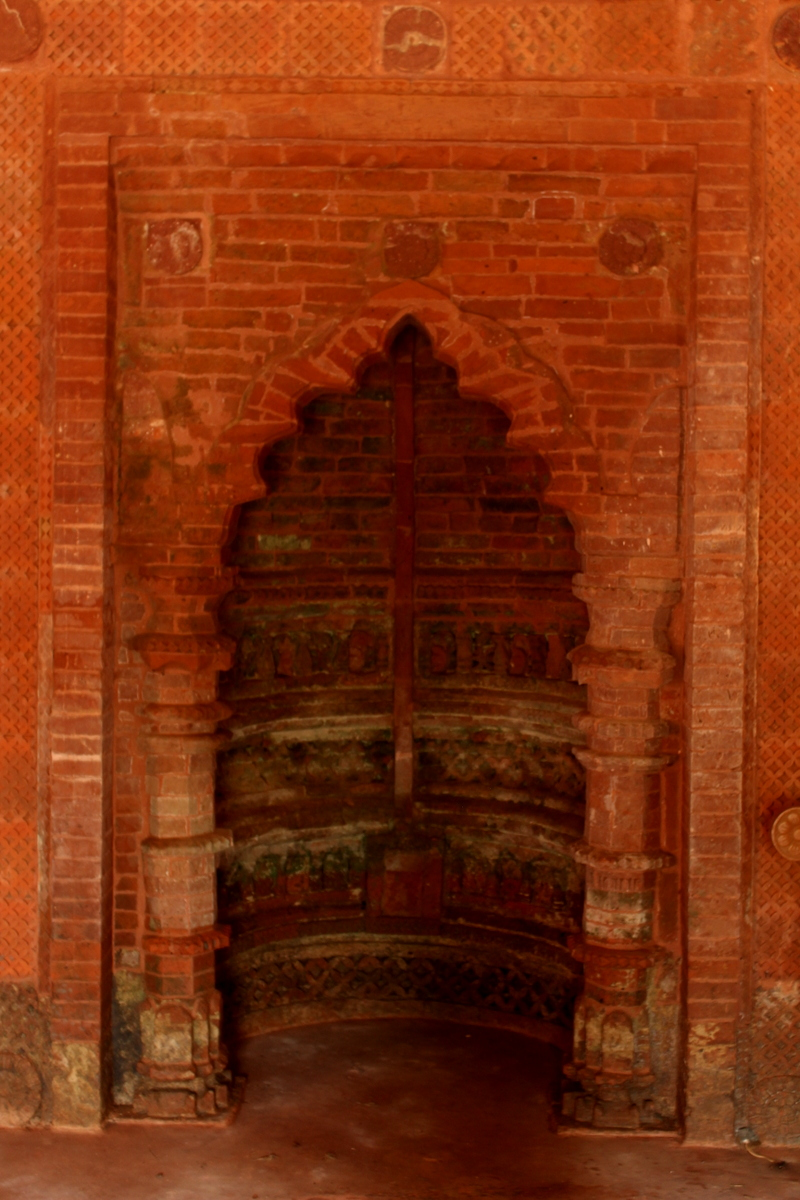
Mihrab of the mosque

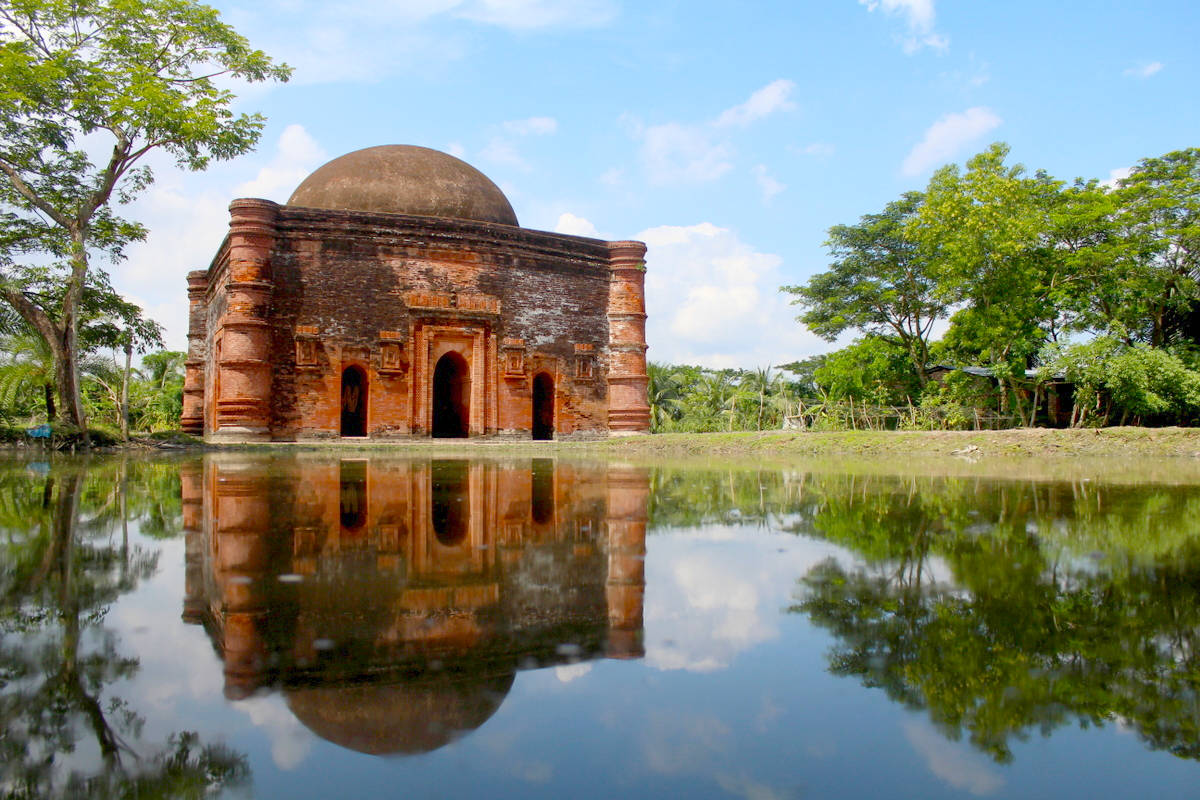
The mosque with three primary entrance and one dome

== See also ==
- Noongola Mosque
- Nasrat Gazi Mosque
- Kismat Maria Mosque

== Bibliography ==
- Hasan, Perween (2007). Sultans and Mosques: The Early Muslim Architecture of Bangladesh. I.B. Tauris. ISBN 978-0-7556-0988-8.
- Michell, George, ed. (1984). The Islamic Heritage of Bengal. Unesco. ISBN 978-92-3-102174-9.
- Ahmed, Abu Sayeed M. (2006). Mosque Architecture in Bangladesh. Dhaka: UNESCO. p. 102. ISBN 9843234693.
