= Mahasthan Brahmi Inscription =

Bengalese epigraphic record

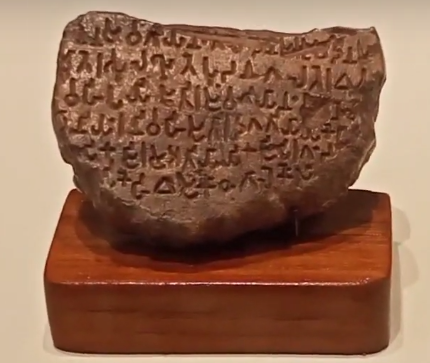
- The limestone slab of the inscription
- Writing: Brahmi script
- Created: 3rd century BC
- Discovered: 1931; Mahasthangarh, Bogra
- Present location: Indian Museum

The Mahasthan Brahmi Inscription is the oldest epigraphic record in the Bengal region. Dating from the 3rd century BCE, it was discovered at Mahasthangarh, Bogra District, Bangladesh. The text is written in the Brahmi script in the Prakrit language. The text denotes an administrative order to store oil and rice for residents in Pundranagar. It is the oldest text on statecraft and governance in the Ganges-Brahmaputra Delta. It has been described as one of the "crown jewels of Bengal".

== Description ==
The text of the inscription records an order from an imperial administrator to the Mahamatra (a high-ranking administrative and judicial officer in ancient India) in the city of Pundranagar (which is identified with modern-day Mahasthangarh). It calls for the alleviation of distress caused to the Saṃvangiya people who were local inhabitants of the town. The storehouse was to be stocked up with four essential commodities, including oil, rice, crops and two varieties of punch-marked coins and cowry shells. It was an administrative decree to stock up essentials for an emergency situation, including floods, fire, crop devastation, famine or any natural disaster.

== Discovery ==
The Mahasthan Brahmi Inscription was discovered on 30 November 1931 in Bogra, British India. It was found by a day laborer who was working in the ruins of the citadel of Mahasthan in Bogra District.

== Significance ==
Most scholars consider the inscription to be a Mauryan decree. According to Banglapedia, "the historical importance of the record lies in the fact that it is the earliest evidence that suggests the authority of the Mauryas in the pundravardhana area. It provides us with the first definite evidence of urbanization in Bengal. The inscription throws light on the circulation of cowries as a medium of exchange in the area of Pundravardhana. It also alludes to the miseries of the people due to natural calamities and the relief measures adopted by the administration". The inscription indicates that a food shortage occurred in Pundravardhana. In response, the government ordered the Mahamatra to stock up rice and oil. Relief was ordered for distressed people. It asked the authority to distribute paddy as well as coins called 'Gondok' and 'Kakonik' (punch-marked coins) among the city dwellers. These punch-marked coins have been discovered across the region and indicate Mauryan rule.

== See also ==
- Rosetta Stone
