= Pundranagar =

Also named as Paharpur

- Mahasthangarh
- Location within Bangladesh
- 24°57′46″N 89°20′45″E
- Location: Mahasthan, Bogra District, Rajshahi Division, Bangladesh

Pundranagar in Paundrabhukti was the most important city in the ancient Bengal region, now identified with the current site of Mahasthan, located in Bogra, Bangladesh. It was a vibrant administrative, religious and cultural centre from the 3rd century BC to the 12th century AD that is from the Maurya Empire time to the Sena dynasty period. Archaeological remains and literary descriptions speak of a truly planned and magnificent city. City walls, elaborate gates, palaces, common dwellings, assembly halls, temples, viharas, shops, ponds and even suburban temples and viharas characterised the city; Chinese pilgrim, Xuanzang (Hiuen tsang), visiting in the 7th century AD, particularly mentions ponds, orchards, flowers and pleasure gardens.

Pundanagar within the Pundravardhana Bhukti suggests it to have been a part of the early historical empires – both Hindu and Buddhist. During the Muslim period the site was not forsaken looking for a new place as was their tradition. The physical feature and the strategic importance of the place must have been of higher priority in the selection process. But the fact that the settlement pattern of the Hindu-Buddhist Period did not hinder in any way their own settlements within the same wall proves that at least in architecture and living way there was a continuity of form and technique which never died out of the Bengalese both liberal and secular.

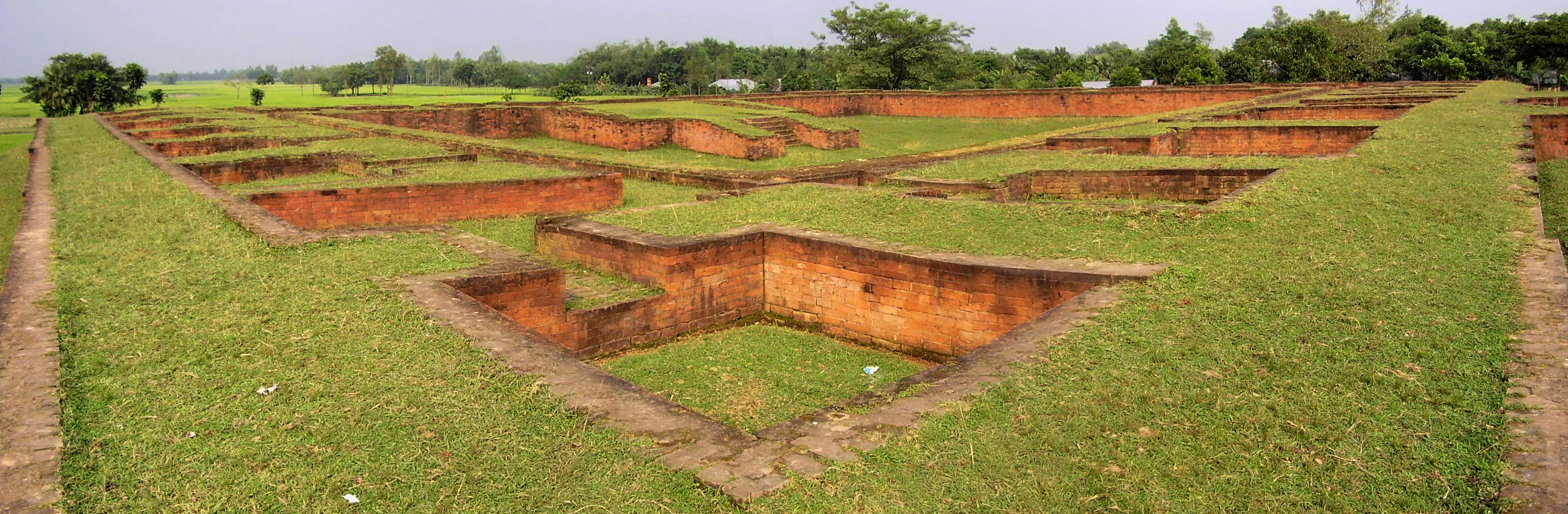
Ruins of ancient Pundranagar

== Etymology ==
There are several theories regarding the word 'Pundra'. According to one theory the word 'Pundra' comes from a disease called 'Pandu'. The land where most of the people suffered from that disease was called Pundrakshetra (land of Pundra). A second theory is that the land where the Pundra species of sugarcane was extensively grown was called Pundradesa (land of Punda). A third explanation comes from later Vedic texts that describe the Pundra as a group of non-Aryan people who lived east of the river Sadanira. In the 1st century AD, the land was mentioned as Pundravardhana for the first time in Ashokadana.

== Geography ==
Some 10 kilometre northeast of Bogra stands Mahasthan, on the banks of the river Karatoya celebrated in ancient literature as a sacred river. Karatoya was once a mighty river before its parent stream – the Teesta or Trisrota (meaning combined flow of three rivers – the Karatoya, the Pundrabhava and the Atrai) flowing down from the Jalpaiguri suddenly shifted its old channel and rushed into the Brahmaputra (Jamuna) in the devastating flood of 1787 AD. Mahasthan or Pundranagar was an important location on a major north south navigation as can be seen in James Rennell's map of Bengal drawn in 1767. It was an impressive fortified citadel enclosed on the south, the west and part of north by a deep moat. Its eastern and part of its northern rampart overlooked the mighty Karatoya. Looking at the dried up skeleton of the river today, one can hardly have any idea of what great role Karatoya played on ancient history of this region. The Karatoya is mentioned in the great epic Mahabharata. A 12th/13th century Sanskrit text, called Karatoya Mahatyam, ascribed to Parsurama, celebrates this river which is described as big as a sea. The Karatoya-Teesta navigation system was the route followed by Ikhtiyar Uddin Muhammad bin Bakhtiyar Khilji when he tried to conquer Tibet in 1205/06. A Persian source mentions an army sailing down the river in the 16th century. So it can be surmised that the importance of Pundranagar was due to its location as an important stage in the north–south fluvial axis from the Bay to Nepal and Tibet.

It is also believed that the location for the city in the area was decided upon because it is one of the highest areas in Bangladesh. The land in the region is almost 36 m above sea level, whereas Dhaka, the capital of Bangladesh, is around 6 m above sea level.

== History ==
The Arthashastra of Kautilya, mentioned about the Silk of Pundra which was smooth like emerald and also similar to Magadhi Silk . Varahamihira, writing in the 6th century AD, mentions in his Brhatsamhita the name of six janapadas in the eastern region: Paundra. Vanga, Samatata, Vardhamana, Gaudaka and Tamraliptaka. Important cities and settlements characterised as janapadas. Pundranagar in Paundrabhukti was the most important city in the eastern region, now identified with the current site of Mahasthan. The excavations at Pundranagar till today revealed seven period of occupation. The remnants of these periods are important and show how these finds created a total period of its history.

Along with the discoveries of Northern Black Polished Ware (NBPW) pottery whose date is known to vary from the 4th century BC to 2nd century BC points to Pundranagar's Buddhist past during the Mauryan rule in the Sub-continent, there is another very strong evidence of its Buddhist past that comes from the accounts of the Chinese pilgrim, Xuanzang (Hiuen Tsang). He visited Pundranagar between the years 638 AD and 645 AD. Xuanzang noticed a large stupa near the city which he called Po-Shi-Po. From his descriptions it appears that the site mentioned by him is the Vasu-Vihara, a Buddhist educational institution. Here Ashoka is said to have erected a large stupa on the body relic of the Enlightened One. The Chinese pilgrim claims in his account that Buddha himself came and stayed here for three months preaching his religion. All these references conclusively establish Pundranagar's close association with the Mauryan rule. With the dissolution of the Mauryan rule what happened to Pundranagar is still a matter of conjecture. Precise historical records are not available for the Shunga phase which is roughly between the 1st century BC and 73 BC. But the discovery of terracotta figurines assigned to this period strongly suggests that the city of Pundranagar continued to flourish during this period. The discovery of a gold coin bearing the bearded figure of Kanishka on the obverse suggests its association with the Kushanas but it does not conclusively prove their sway over Pundranagar. However, epigraphic records suggest that from the 4th century onward Bengal came to be subjugated by the Guptas and Pundranagar came to be regarded as the stronghold of Gupta defences in the eastern flank of their empire. The Damodarpur copper plate of Buddha Gupta suggests that Pundranagar flourished as the capital of the entire northern Bengal and it formed an integral part of the Gupta empire down to the end of the 5th century. In the early 7th century Shashanka who established an independent rule in Gauda undertook a systematic persecution of the Buddhists and during this period Pundranagar's strong Buddhist influence may have suffered an eclipse. It is, however, with the rise of the Palas that Pundranagar once again became the seat of an independent government under Gopala. Though his son Dharmapala shifted his capital to Magadha, Pundranagar continued to thrive under the Palas. Its prosperity continued unabated until the coming of the Muslims in the early 13th century. The Bengal Sultans established' their capital in Gauda region. Pundranagar was abandoned and left to fall into decay and ruin.

Bangladesh-France joint ventures have been conducting successful excavations since 1993, and as of 2003, the joint missions have unearthed eighteen construction layers. The cultural artifacts obtained from the excavation results could be classified under the following period-heads.

=== First period ===
In this period as the remnants of the pre-Mauryan era a large number of Northern Black Polished Wares, Rouletted wares, black and red pottery, black hued polished pots, stone-blocks, mud houses with mud floors, cooking furnace and pillar-pits are reported to have been found in the excavated spots. This was possibly the first human habitation on Pleistocene landscape known as the Barind Tract in the pre-Mauryan times.

=== Second period ===
The artefacts which were found of this age are broken tiles, the brickbats, potsherds, ring stones, bronze-mirrors, bronze lamps, dice-cast coins, terracotta plaques and stone beads representing the characteristics of the Mauryan period.

=== Third period ===
This is the post-Mauryan age covering the Shunga and Kushana periods. Of the periods the remnants of big and well-protected brick-built structures, the brick-strewn floors, pillar-pits, the terracotta plaques of the Shunga period, the semi-precious stones and beads, the temples' pinnacles and other such artefacts are reported to have been noticed.

=== Fourth period ===
In this age are unearthed the antiquarian relics of the Kushan-Gupta periods. A large number of broken clay-pots, artistic terracotta plaques with various figures, the decorated cooking-pots, the dishes and other such items of importance are traced. The architectural remnants of this layer are comparatively less than those of upper and lower layers. Moreover, semi- precious stone and glass beads, dishes and terracotta seals are worth mentioning objects of cultural importance of this age.

=== Fifth period ===
This period represents the Gupta and late Gupta phase. The phase yielded remains of a massive brick structure of a temple called Govinda Bhita, located close to the fort-city, belonging to the late Gupta period, as well as other brick structures – houses, floors, streets in the city, and huge antiquities, including terracotta plaques of the characteristic style, seals, beads of terracotta, glass and semi-precious stones, terracotta balls, copper and iron objects and stamped wares.

=== Sixth period ===
This period represents the Pala-Sena phase evidenced by architectural remains of several sites scattered throughout the eastern side of the city like Khodar Pathar Bhita, Mankalir Kunda, Parasuram's palace and Bairagir Bhita. This was the most flourishing phase and during this period a large number of Buddhist establishments were erected outside the city.

=== Seventh period ===
This period represents the Muslim phase testified by the architectural remains of a fifteen-domed mosque of the Sultanate period, a single domed mosque built by Farrukh Siyar, the Mughal emperor, and other antiquities like Chinese celadon and glazed ware typical of the age. Bairagir Bhita, Khodar Pathar Bhita, Munkalir Kunda Mound, Parsuram's palace mound and Jiat Kunda are some sites inside the city which have yielded archaeological objects of interest.

== Citadel ==
A visitor to Mahasthan / Pundranagar is impressed by the city walls enclosing an area of 22,500,000 sq. feet. The citadel (see map alongside), the fortified heart of the ancient city, is rectangular in plan, measuring roughly 1.523 km long from north to south, and 1.371 km from east to west, with high and wide ramparts in all its wings. The Karatoya, once a mighty river but now a small stream, flows on its east but the presence of other ruins and mounds around suggest that the citadel had flourishing suburbs. At present there are several mounds and structural vestiges inside the fortifications. Of these a few of note are: Jiat Kunda (well possessing life giving power), Mankalir Dhap (place consecrated to Mankali), Parasuramer Basgriha (palace of a king named Parasuram), Bairagir Bhita (palace of a female anchorite), Khodar Pathar Bhita (place of stone bestowed by God), and Munir Ghon (a bastion). There are some gateways at different points: Kata Duar (in the north), Dorab Shah Toran (in the east), Burir Fatak (in the south), and Tamra Dawaza (in the west). Besides these, there are 31 other sites and mounds around Mahasthan.

Xuanzang (Hiuen Tsang) visiting Pundranagar in the mid-7th century observed that its circumference was about five miles (30 li). He noticed about 20 Buddhist monasteries accommodating some 3000 monks and about 100 Brahmanical temples, but the greater numbers of heretics were Nirgrantha (Jaina) who went about naked. Sandhyakar Nandi writing in the middle of the 12th century has drawn a glorious picture of the city in his Ramacharita as 'the crown jewel of Varenda'. The splendours of the city's royal palaces, state secretariate, mansions, luxurious villas of the noblemen and merchants, flourishing marts, ornate temples, assembly halls, the garrison within the heavily fortified city ramparts and moats as portrayed by him seem to be no less brilliant than Vaisali, Rajagriha, Sravasti, Kausambi, Pataliputra or any other famous ancient cities of Aryavarta during the early historic period. The poet further mentioned that the social workers, labourers and the dwellings of the middle class citizens were located in its extensive suburbs outside the protected area of the citadel. The excavation and exploration in its ambient areas agree exactly with the descriptions of Sandhyakar Nandi.

== Discovery ==
Punadranagar which was first discovered by Sir Alexander Cunningham who visited the place in 1879 and was not pleased to see the site. Sir Alexander Cunningham wrote;

The place is so extensive and in many parts especially amongst the brick ruins, so thickly covered with jangal, that it is impossible to make any satisfactory exploration, save at a great waste of both time and money.

But Sir Alexander was correct in assuming that the Chinese pilgrim's description of Pundravardhana (Pan-na-fa-tan-na as he wrote in Chinese) came close to this walled city in ruins. He observed that its circumference was about eight miles. However, behind what Cunningham considered a 'waste of time and money' lay the glorious heritage of a nation that needed to be discovered.

== Explorations and excavations ==
Explorations during the British period under the direction of K.N.Dixit and during the Pakistan period under N. Ahmed have led to a renewed interest in the past of a nation that can now trace its history back to the 4th century BC. A French archaeological team has been busy with the exploration of the site since 1991 under Jean- Francois Salle.

The team has done some valuable work dividing excavation into six phases and it is now definitely understood that the site shows 'a continuous occupation from its lowest layers to its abandon in the 13th century; the details of the levels are still to 'be studied and measured accurately, and when completed, the stratigraphical sequence will provide a unique reference system for the whole of East India where no other site has ever yielded such a comparable and rich stratigraphy

The French have for the first time put things on a scientific basis having done some C14 dating. Phase 5 of their excavation work of the northern building provided 'two C14 dates of the 1st and 2nd century AD'. This is confirmed by archaeological materials such as cast copper coins of Mauryan type still in use in the 1st and 2nd centuries AD, numerous terracotta plaques of Shunga style, and a large variety of Black Polished Ware. The discovery of this N.B.P. pottery whose date is known to vary from the 4th century BC to 2nd century BC points to Pundranagar's Buddhist past during the Mauryan rule in the Sub-continent. The discovery of a limestone tablet from Mahasthan in 1931 confirms this. The tablet bears six lines of Ashokan Brahmi inscription directing the Mahamatra (governor) of Pundranagar to distribute food grain and money from government stores to the famine-stricken people of the area. The sympathy evinced in the inscription strongly suggests that this was an imperial order from Ashoka himself. Excavations in 1907 and 1961 exposed the plan of a dwelling house which is comparatively modern and is ascribes to the later 18th century or early 19th century. But a deep trench dug at a later date revealed a fragmentary building phases of an earlier date, probably 8th century AD.

== See also ==
- Somapura Mahavihara
- Kantajew Temple
- Shahbaz Khan Mosque
- Shona Mosque
- Bagha Mosque
- Chawk Mosque
- Khan Mohammad Mridha Mosque
- Sixty Dome Mosque
- Saat Masjid
- Lalbagh Fort
