= Chawk Mosque =

Chawk Mosque may refer to:

- Chawk Mosque, Dhaka, Bangladesh
- Chawk Mosque, Murshidabad, West Bengal, India
