= Sannyasir Dhap =

Archaeological site in Mainamati, Comilla, Bangladesh

- সন্ন্যাসীর ধাপ
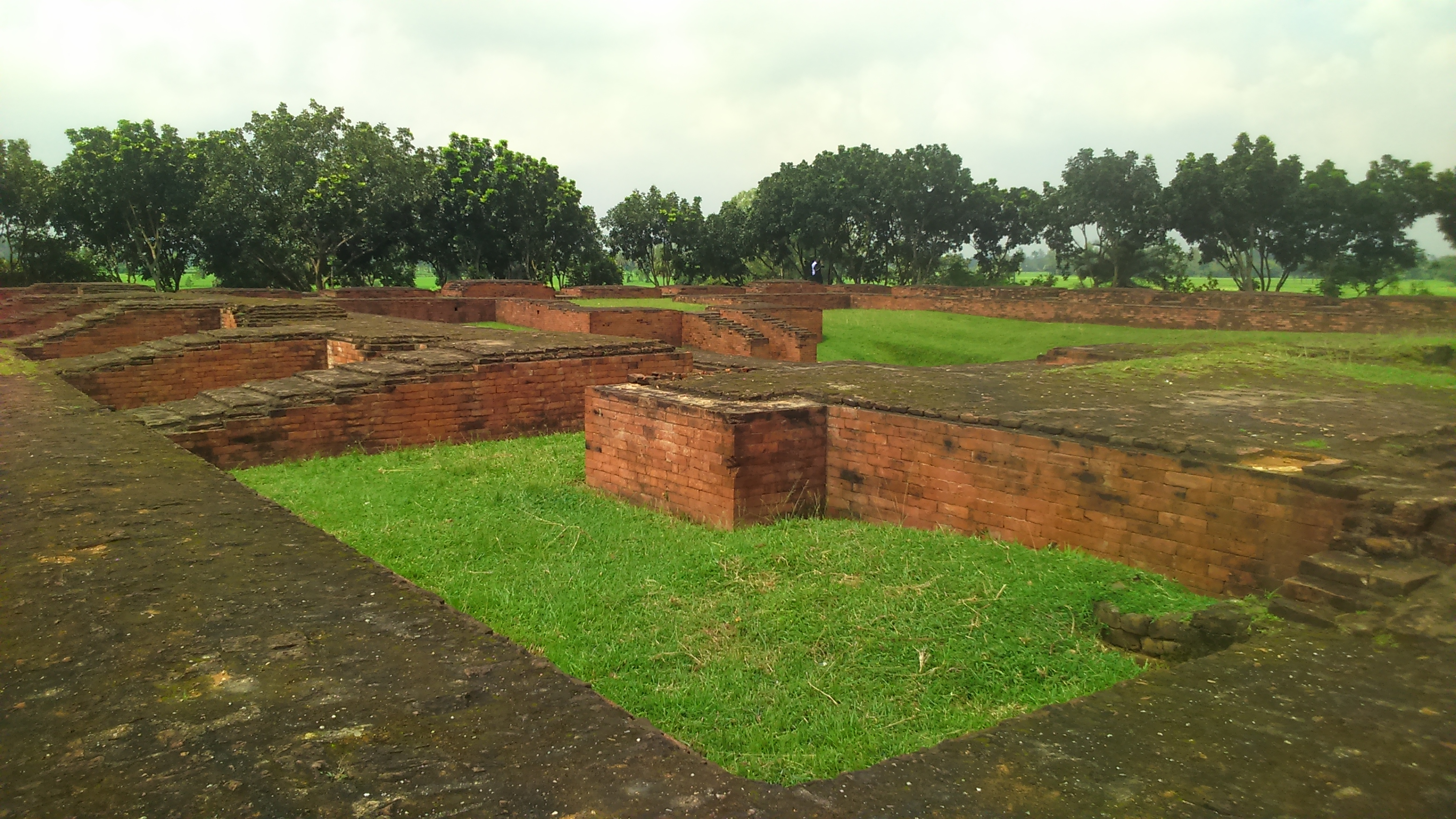
- Sannyasir Dhap

- Location within Bangladesh Location within Southwest Asia
- 24°58′58″N 89°17′52″E
- Location: Sadar Upazila, Bogra, Rajshahi Division, Bangladesh

The Sannyasir Dhap (Bengali: সন্ন্যাসীর ধাপ) is one of the notable archaeological sites and tourist attractions located in Sadar Upazila of Bogra, Bangladesh. The site consists of two mounds, which are situated approximately 3 kilometers apart from each other. One of the mounds is located in Bara Tangra village under Namuja Union, while the other is in Saralpur village under Gokul Union.

== History ==
It is not known in detail who built the two mounds of Sannyasir Dhap. However, archaeologists believe that the ascetic Hindu monks (Sannyasis) of the region during that time likely used these mounds as their hermitages or monasteries. Since they were constructed or utilized by these monks, the mounds came to be known as Sannyasir Dhap (the Mounds of the Sannyasis).

=== Bara Tangra Sannyasir Dhap ===
Located in Bara Tangra village under Namuja Union, the Bara Tangra Sannyasir Dhap is currently covered with vegetation, including trees, grass, and vines. The central portion of the mound is elevated, with gentle slopes extending downwards on all sides. Its dimensions are approximately 215 meters × 148 meters × 7.5 meters. Scattered around the mound are the remains of ancient bricks, indicating the presence of an old structure.

=== Saralpur Sannyasir Dhap ===
The Saralpur Sannyasir Dhap, located in Saralpur village under Gokul Union, is smaller in size compared to its counterpart in Bara Tangra. It measures approximately 33 meters × 27 meters × 6.5 meters. Although the main mound is still visible, the local villagers have leveled the top surface and now use it as an Eidgah (an open field for Eid prayers).

== Gallery ==
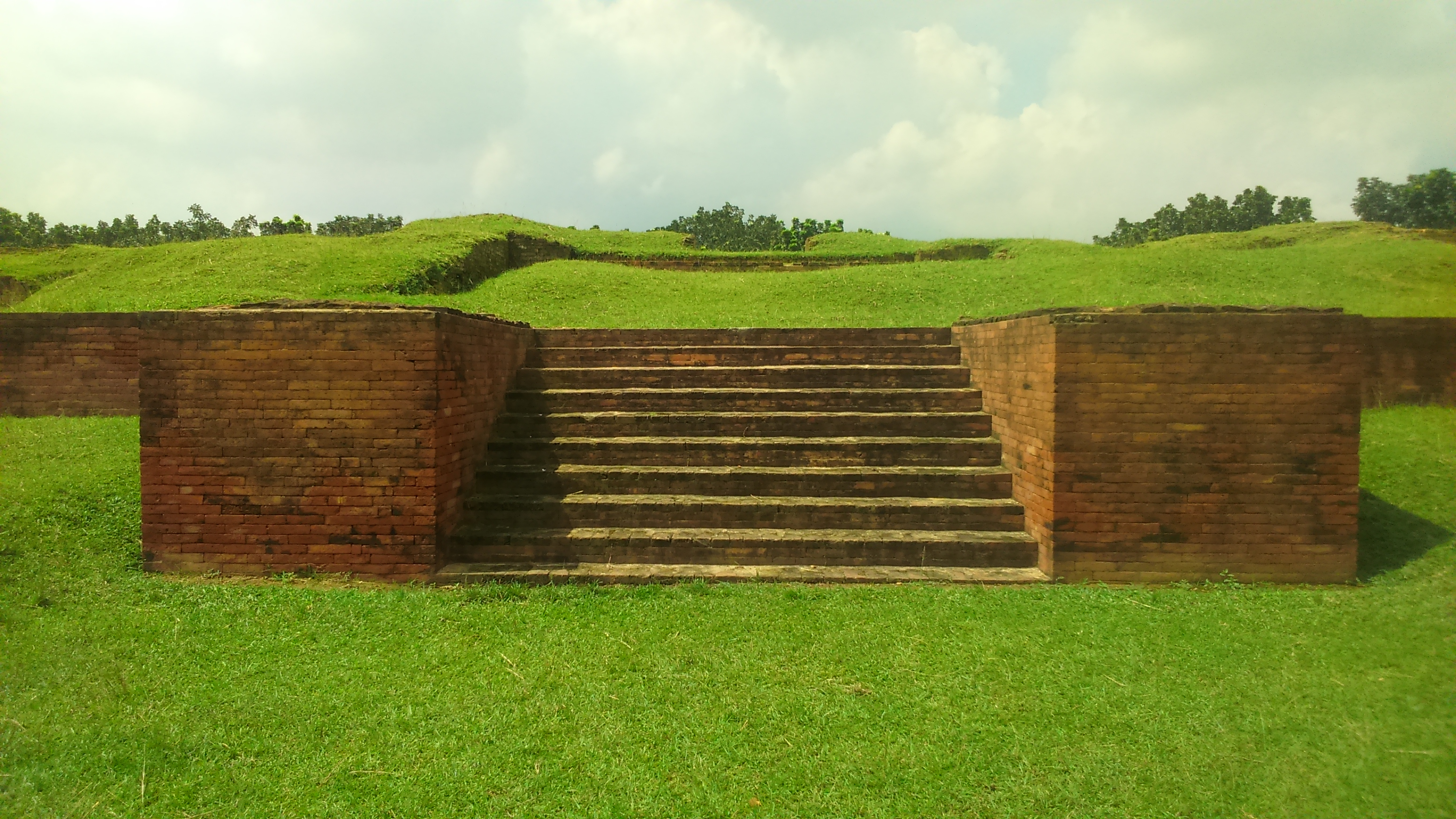

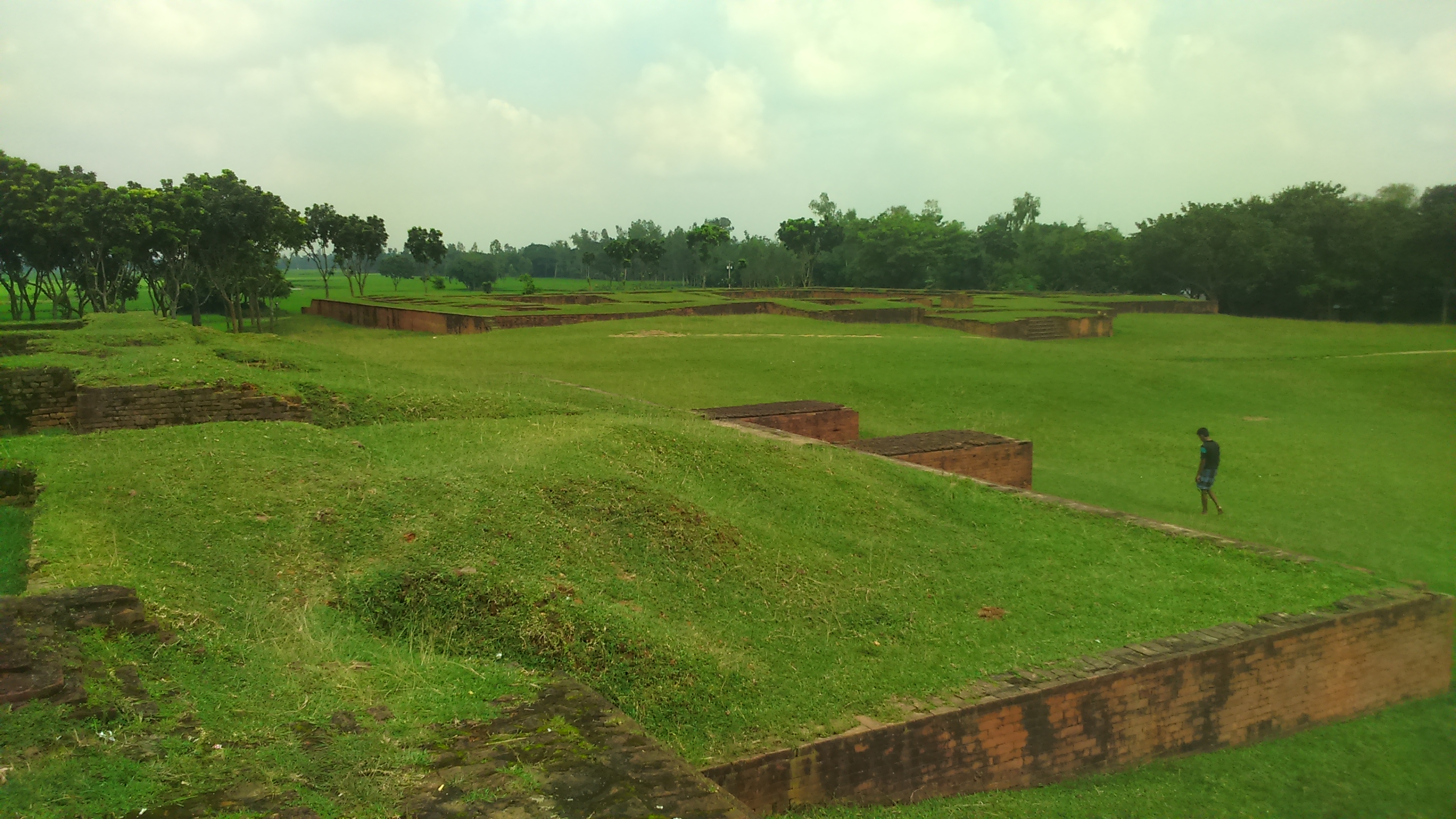

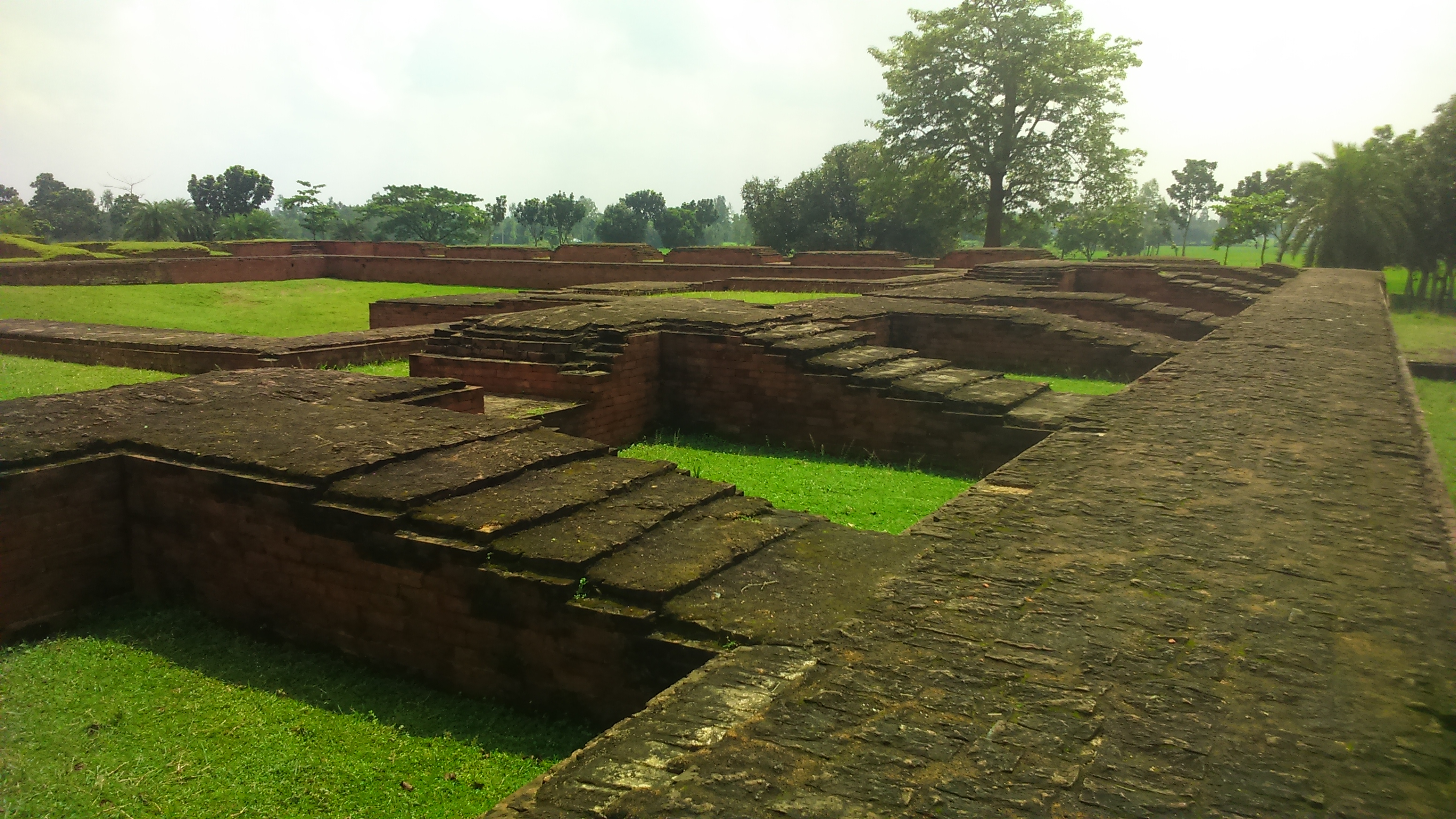

== See also ==
- Vasu Vihara
- List of archaeological sites in Bangladesh
