= Mayor of Bogura =

Official post of RCC

- Incumbent; M. R. Islam Shadhin since 19 May 2026
- Bogura City Corporation
- Style: Honourable (formal)
- Type: Council Leader
- Member of: Bogura City Corporation
- Seat: Nagar Bhaban, Bogura
- Appointer: Electorate of Bogura
- Term length: Five years, renewable
- Constituting instrument: The City Corporation act, 2009
- Formation: 20 April 2026; 4 months ago

The Mayor of Bogura is the chief elected executive of the Bogura City Corporation. The mayor’s office oversees civic services, manages public properties, and coordinates the functions of various government agencies within the city. In addition, the Mayor is responsible for enforcing city corporation regulations and state laws, thereby ensuring good governance and the sustainable development of Bogura.

The mayor's office is located in Nagar Bhaban; it has jurisdiction over all 28 wards of the city of Bogura.

== List of officeholders ==
Political parties

- Bangladesh Nationalist Party

Other factions

- Independent

Status

- Acting Mayor or Administrator

No.	Portrait	Officeholder (birth–death)	Election	Term of office			Designation	Political party	Reference
No.	Portrait	Officeholder (birth–death)	Election	From	To	Period	Designation	Political party	Reference
–		M. R. Islam Shadhin	–	19 May 2026	Incumbent	111 days	Administrator	Bangladesh Nationalist Party	

== See also ==
- Bogura District
- Rajshahi Division
- List of city corporations in Bangladesh
