= NPSB =

NPSB may refer to:

- National Payment Switch Bangladesh, payment switch of Bangladesh financial system
- National Psychological Strategy Board, psychologic warfare board of US government.
