= Pirgachha, Bogra =

Pirgachha, Bogra পীরগাছা Pirgacha
- Nickname: Pirgachha
- Location in Bogra
- Coordinates: 24.9520°N 89.4020°E
- Country: Bangladesh
- Division: Rajshahi Division
- Village: Bogra District

Population (2011)
  - Total: 793
- Time zone: UTC+6 (Bangladesh Time)
- Postal code: 5800

Pirgachha is a village in Lahiripara Union of Bogra Sadar Upazila, Bogra District, Bangladesh.

== Geography ==
It is 12 kilometres (7.5 mi) to the north from Bogra.

== Demographics ==
According to the 2011 Bangladesh census, the population of the village was 793. 57% are Muslims and 43% are Hindus.

== Market ==
The market has 150 vegetable shops, 3 showrooms and 5 tea stalls in this village.

== Religion ==
The village hosts two mosques.

== Education ==
The village has a 3 kindergartens, government primary school, and a high school.
