= Bogura Development Authority =

- বগুড়া উন্নয়ন কর্তৃপক্ষ

Agency overview
- Formed: Proposed
- Jurisdiction: Bogura
- Headquarters: Bogura, Bangladesh
- Agency executive: Chairman
- Parent agency: Ministry of Housing and Public Works

Bogura Development Authority (Bengali: বগুড়া উন্নয়ন কর্তৃপক্ষ, romanized: Bogura Unnoyon Kortripokkho) is a proposed urban planning authority for the planned development, regulation, and management of Bogura , Bangladesh. Proposed in 2026 by the Government of Bangladesh, the authority is intended to prepare and implement the city's master plans, regulate urban development activities, and guide the expansion of the city of Bogura.
