= Cox's Bazar City Corporation =

Proposed city corporation in Bangladesh

Cox's Bazar City Corporation কক্সবাজার সিটি কর্পোরেশন

Type
- Type: City Corporation

History
- Founded: TBD

Leadership
- Mayor: Vacant since 19 August 2024
- Deputy Mayor: Vacant
- Chief Executive Officer: Vacant

Structure
- Seats: TBD
- Length of term: Up to five years

Elections
- Voting system: First past the post
- Next election: TBD

Cox's Bazar City Corporation (Bengali: কক্সবাজার সিটি কর্পোরেশন, romanized: Koksbajar Siti Korporeshon) is a proposed city corporation in Bangladesh aimed to improve urban governance and management in the resort town of Cox's Bazar. The city of Cox's Bazar, with its sea beach, has been expanded rapidly as a tourist destination and resort town. The establishment of the city corporation is expected, by the government, to improve urban planning and amenities. This process is currently in an early stage of development.

== History ==
Cox's Bazar Municipality was established in 1869. The plan of upgrading the Cox's Bazar Municipality to a city corporation was announced by Prime Minister Tarique Rahman during his visit to the Cox's Bazar District on 19 June 2026. Lutfur Rahman Kajal, MP of Cox's Bazar 3 constituency, has also requested the Ministry of Local Government. Rural Development and Cooperatives to upgrade the municipality to a city corporation.

On July 28, 2026, Broadcasting Adviser Zahed Ur Rahman announced that the process of upgrading Cox's Bazar Municipality into a City Corporation is underway. The Prime Minister's Office has directed the Local Government Engineering Department to take swift action regarding the implementation of the Cox's Bazar City Corporation and to publish a progress report.

== See also ==
- List of city corporations in Bangladesh
- Cox's Bazar
- Cox's Bazar Beach
- Cox's Bazar District
- Chittagong Division
- Chittagong City Corporation
