= Bogura City Corporation =

Local governing body of Bangladesh

Bogura City Corporation বগুড়া সিটি কর্পোরেশন

Type
- Type: City Corporation

History
- Founded: 20 April 2026; 5 months ago
- New session started: 19 May 2026; (137 days)

Leadership
- Mayor: Vacant since 19 August 2024
- Administrator: M. R. Islam Shadhin, BNP since 19 May 2026
- Deputy Mayor: Vacant since 22 September 2018
- Chief Executive Officer: Md. Rezaul Karim since 30 April 2026

Structure
- Seats: Vacant seats 28 councillors
- Length of term: Up to five years

Elections
- Voting system: First past the post
- Next election: 2026

Meeting place
- Nagar Bhaban, Bogura

Website
- https://bogcc.gov.bd

Bogura City Corporation (BOGCC) (Bengali: বগুড়া সিটি কর্পোরেশন) is a local government authority responsible for administering all civic services in Bogura, a city in Bangladesh. The BOGCC government is elected by popular vote every five years. The corporation is headed by a mayor, who oversees a council consisting of 28 councillors representing different wards of the city. The functions and powers of the BOGCC are defined under the provisions of the City Corporation Act, 2009.

Spanning both the east and west banks of the Karatoa River, approximately 200 km northwest of Dhaka, Bogura serves as a major economic, cultural, and historical hub in northern Bangladesh. Covering an area of 69.56 km² with a population of 486,016 (2022 census), the city is renowned for its proximity to the ancient archaeological site of Mahasthangarh, its leadership in agricultural machinery manufacturing, and its production of red chili and Bogura curd. The corporation governs 21 wards, led by a mayor and 28 councillors (including 7 reserved for women). All positions remain vacant as of April 30, 2025, pending elections.

== History ==
Bogura’s administrative history began in 1876 with the establishment of Bogura Municipality, initially covering 1.25 km² with 7,000 residents across three wards. In 1981, it was upgraded to a Class 'A' municipality, expanding to 14.76 km² with 12 wards. By 2006, the municipal area grew to 69.56 km², incorporating 21 wards, making it Bangladesh’s largest municipality by area at the time. On April 27, 2025, the Ministry of Local Government, Rural Development and Co-operatives issued a gazette notification upgrading it to Bogura City Corporation, following a public consultation process initiated by Deputy Commissioner Hosna Afroza in February 2025. On 7 May 2026, following the 120th meeting of the National Implementation Committee on Administrative Reorganisation, the formation of the Bogura City Corporation got its approval from the government, along with the formation of a new upazila in the Bogura District named 'Mokamtala'.

== Functions and Services ==
The Bogura City Corporation (BOGCC) is responsible for administering the city and ensuring the provision of essential infrastructure and public services. Its functions include urban planning, transport management, healthcare, education, waste management, water supply, and security. Through these services, BOGCC aims to improve the quality of life for residents and promote sustainable urban development.

Departments of Bogura City Corporation
#	Departments	Functions / Services
1	Office of the Mayor	Executive administration; city governance; supervision of all BOGCC services
2	Chief Executive Office	Departmental coordination; service implementation monitoring
3	Administration And Establishment	HR management; staff recruitment; service delivery monitoring
4	Finance and Accounts	Budget preparation; financial planning; payment processing; accounts management; internal audit
5	Engineering	Road-cutting permission; building design approval; contractor registration; land demarcation certificates
6	Urban Planning and Development	Road, drain, bridge, culvert and footpath development; land development; planned residential areas; city beautification
7	Electricity	Installation and maintenance of street lights; lamp-post management; city illumination
8	Transportation and Communication	Urban transport management; traffic & parking control; emergency transport; corpse handling; bus terminal management; road roller & ambulance services
9	Waste Management and Cleaning	Solid waste collection and disposal; street cleaning; drain clearing; mosquito control; landfill management
10	Health	Hospital & clinic management; maternal & child immunization; vitamin A campaigns; midwifery and health technology training
11	Registrar	Birth & death certificates; nationality, inheritance & character certificates
12	Education	Management of schools, madrasas, Sanskrit tolls, kindergartens, technical institutes; adult education; teacher training; cultural & theatre institutes
13	Water Supply and Sewerage	Clean water supply and sewerage management in the entire city corporation.
14	Revenue	Trade license issuance & renewal; holding tax collection; shop/market allotment; lease and asset management
15	Security and Law and Order	City security; joint operations with Bogura District Police; CCTV installation and monitoring
16	Magistracy	Arbitration-based case settlement; mobile courts; anti-adulteration drives
17	Housing and Public Works	Distribution and maintenance of residential plots and flats
18	Cultural and Social Development	National Day celebrations; charity programs; and children’s park and playground construction & maintenance
19	Environmental Protection	Pollution control; climate change mitigation; urban greening; tree plantation
20	Religious Welfare	Support for Eid, Puja, and religious events; Qurbani market permissions; land allocation for religious events

== Ward and councillor list ==
#	Ward	Councillor	Party
1	Ward-1	Vacant	TBD
2	Ward-2	Vacant	TBD
3	Ward-3	Vacant	TBD
4	Ward-4	Vacant	TBD
5	Ward-5	Vacant	TBD
6	Ward-6	Vacant	TBD
7	Ward-7	Vacant	TBD
8	Ward-8	Vacant	TBD
9	Ward-9	Vacant	TBD
10	Ward-10	Vacant	TBD
11	Ward-11	Vacant	TBD
12	Ward-12	Vacant	TBD
13	Ward-13	Vacant	TBD
14	Ward-14	Vacant	TBD
15	Ward-15	Vacant	TBD
16	Ward-16	Vacant	TBD
17	Ward-17	Vacant	TBD
18	Ward-18	Vacant	TBD
19	Ward-19	Vacant	TBD
20	Ward-20	Vacant	TBD
21	Ward-21	Vacant	TBD
Reserved Women's Councillor
22	Reserved women's seat-1	Vacant	TBD
23	Reserved women's seat-2	Vacant	TBD
24	Reserved women's seat-3	Vacant	TBD
25	Reserved women's seat-4	Vacant	TBD
26	Reserved women's seat-5	Vacant	TBD
27	Reserved women's seat-6	Vacant	TBD
28	Reserved women's seat-7	Vacant	TBD

== Administration ==
Bogura City Corporation spans both the east and west banks of the Karatoa River, a tributary of the Jamuna River, at coordinates 24.85°N 89.37°E in northern Bangladesh. It is surrounded by rural areas of Bogura District and bordered by districts such as Natore, Sirajganj, and Gaibandha. The city serves as a gateway to North Bengal, benefiting from its location along the Dhaka-Rangpur Highway and railway lines connecting Dhaka and Rajshahi.

The corporation governs 21 wards, comprising 18 from Bogura Sadar Upazila and parts of 3 from Shahjahanpur Upazila. It is led by a mayor and 28 councillors, with 7 seats reserved for women. Shahjahan Alam serves as the chief executive officer, overseeing urban planning, utilities, infrastructure, and public services.

== Deputies ==
The deputy mayor (also known as panel mayor) is the elected executive of the City Corporation. Three panel mayors are chosen from council members, with the top-voted serving as deputy mayor and acting mayor in the mayor’s absence. The other two panel mayors assist in overseeing key offices and supporting executive functions.

No.	Position	Incumbent
1	Panel Mayor 1	Vacant
2	Panel Mayor 2	Vacant
3	Panel Mayor 3	Vacant

== List of mayors ==
Political parties

- Bangladesh Nationalist Party

Other factions

- Independent

Status

- Acting Mayor or Administrator

No.	Portrait	Officeholder (birth–death)	Election	Term of office			Designation	Political party	Reference
No.	Portrait	Officeholder (birth–death)	Election	From	To	Period	Designation	Political party	Reference
–		M. R. Islam Shadhin	–	19 May 2026	Incumbent	137 days	Administrator	Bangladesh Nationalist Party	

== Demographics ==
According to the 2022 Bangladesh census, the city of Bogura has a population of 486,016 across 126,412 households, with a literacy rate of 65.7%. This corrects inflated estimates, such as the 981,000 reported elsewhere, which likely refer to the broader metro area. The sex ratio is 104.23 females per 100 males, and approximately 15.34% of the population is under 10 years of age, indicating a young demographic. The city is predominantly Muslim (approximately 90%), with a Hindu minority (around 9%), and Christian and Buddhist communities (about 1%), based on district-level data. Ethnically, the majority are Bengali, with a small presence of indigenous Santal groups.

The religious composition is summarized below:

Religious Composition of Bogura District (Approximated for City)
Religion	Percentage
Muslim	90%
Hindu	9%
Christian	0.5%
Buddhist	0.5%

== See also ==
- Bogura District
- Rajshahi Division
- List of city corporations in Bangladesh
