= National Payment Switch Bangladesh =

National payment switch of Bangladesh

- Operating area: Bangladesh
- Members: 57 Banks
- Founded: 2012; 14 years ago
- Owner: Bangladesh Bank
- Website: www.bb.org.bd/en/index.php/financialactivity/paysystems

National Payment Switch Bangladesh (NPSB) is a Bangladeshi payment network that ensures national interoperability between account and card based transactions across banks in Bangladesh. It is owned and operated by Bangladesh's central bank the Bangladesh Bank. It supports ATMs, POS, and internet banking fund transfers with Mobile financial services (MFS).

== History ==
NPSB was established in 2012. In 2025, Standard Chartered Bangladesh announced they were fully integrated with NPSB and also supported Bangla QR payment.

== Operations ==
At its launch there were transaction limits, individuals could transact maximum 3,00,000 taka/transaction at a frequency of maximum 10 times/day and no more than 10,00,000 taka per day. Corporate clients could transact 5,00,000 taka/transaction and maximum frequency as 20/day and 25,00,000 taka per day. 2FA is mandatory for participating banks, with respect to online, e-commerce, interbanking, card not present transactions.

In 2022, frequency limitations were lifted.
