= Baghopara =

Village in Rajshahi Division, Bangladesh

Coordinates: 24°55′03″N 89°20′49″E

Baghopara is a village in Gokul Union under Bogra Sadar Upazila of Bogra District, Bangladesh.

== Demographics ==
According to the 2011 Bangladesh census, Baghopara had 1,220 households and a population of 5,037. 7.7% of the population was under the age of 5. The literacy rate (age 7 and over) was 57.7%, compared to the national average of 51.8%.
