= List of city corporations in Bangladesh =

A city corporation is a local government authority that manages all civic services in metropolitan cities of Bangladesh. The city corporation government is elected by popular vote every five years. Each city corporation is headed by a mayor, who presides over the councillors. The city corporations operate under the provisions of The City Corporation act, 2009. There are 13 city corporations in Bangladesh. Two of them are present in the capital Dhaka. One is present in each of the other seven divisional cities, with four others. They perform a variety of socio-economic and civic functions. Bogura is the newest on the list.

== List of city mayors ==
City	Name	Took office (tenure length)	Party
Barishal	Bilkis Akhtar Jahan Shirin	14 March 2026	Bangladesh Nationalist Party
Bogura	M. R. Islam Shadhin	19 May 2026	Bangladesh Nationalist Party
Chittagong	Dr. Shahadat Hossain	3 November 2024	Bangladesh Nationalist Party
Comilla	Yusuf Molla Tipu	14 March 2026	Bangladesh Nationalist Party
Dhaka North	Safiqul Islam Khan Milton	23 February 2026	Bangladesh Nationalist Party
Dhaka South	Md. Abdus Salam	23 February 2026	Bangladesh Nationalist Party
Gazipur	Md. Showkat Hossain Sarker	23 February 2026	Bangladesh Nationalist Party
Khulna	Nazrul Islam Manju	23 February 2026	Bangladesh Nationalist Party
Mymensingh	Rukonuzzaman Rokon	14 March 2026	Bangladesh Nationalist Party
Narayanganj	Md. Sakhawat Hossain Khan	23 February 2026	Bangladesh Nationalist Party
Rajshahi	Mahfuzur Rahman	14 March 2026	Bangladesh Nationalist Party
Rangpur	Mahfuz Un Nabi Chowdhury	14 March 2026	Bangladesh Nationalist Party
Sylhet	Abdul Quiyum Choudhury	23 February 2026	Bangladesh Nationalist Party

== List of city corporations ==
City corporation	Seal	Abbreviation	Mayor	Ruling party	Cities	Division	Area (km^{2})	Population 2022	Website
Dhaka North City Corporation		DNCC	Administrator	Bangladesh Nationalist Party	Dhaka	Dhaka	196.22	5,979,537	dncc.gov.bd
Dhaka South City Corporation		DSCC	Administrator	Bangladesh Nationalist Party	Dhaka	Dhaka	109.25	4,299,345	dscc.gov.bd
Gazipur City Corporation		GCC	Administrator	Bangladesh Nationalist Party	Gazipur	Dhaka	329.53	2,677,715	gcc.gov.bd
Narayanganj City Corporation		NCC	Administrator	Bangladesh Nationalist Party	Narayanganj	Dhaka	72.43	967,724	ncc.gov.bd
Chattogram City Corporation		CCC	Shahadat Hossain	Bangladesh Nationalist Party	Chattogram	Chattogram	168.07	3,227,246	ccc.gov.bd
Cumilla City Corporation		CUCC	Administrator	Bangladesh Nationalist Party	Comilla	Chattogram	53.04	439,414	cocc.gov.bd
Rajshahi City Corporation		RCC	Administrator	Bangladesh Nationalist Party	Rajshahi	Rajshahi	96.72	552,791	rcc.gov.bd
Bogura City Corporation		BOCC	Administrator	Bangladesh Nationalist Party	Bogura	Rajshahi	69.90	540,000	bogcc.gov.bd
Khulna City Corporation		KCC	Administrator	Bangladesh Nationalist Party	Khulna	Khulna	91.315	718,735	kcc.gov.bd
Rangpur City Corporation		RPCC	Administrator	Bangladesh Nationalist Party	Rangpur	Rangpur	203.63	708,384	rpcc.gov.bd
Sylhet City Corporation		SCC	Administrator	Bangladesh Nationalist Party	Sylhet	Sylhet	79.50	532,426	scc.gov.bd
Mymensingh City Corporation		MCC	Administrator	Bangladesh Nationalist Party	Mymensingh	Mymensingh	91.35	577,000	mcc.gov.bd
Barishal City Corporation		BCC	Administrator	Bangladesh Nationalist Party	Barishal	Barishal	58	419,351	bcc.gov.bd

== Councillors ==
Council of City Corporation সিটি কর্পোরেশনের পরিষদ

Type
- Type: City Corporation

Structure
- Seats: Vacant seats 668
- Length of term: Up to five years

Elections
- Voting system: First past the post

A council of city corporation is the governing body of a[city corporation, composed of elected representatives from each ward. These ward councillors collectively participate in enacting local regulations, formulating policies, making decisions affecting the community, and overseeing the delivery of municipal services. The council operates under the leadership of the mayor, who presides over its meetings and provides overall direction for city governance. Bangladesh has a total of 668 councillors across its 13 city corporations.

== Gallery ==
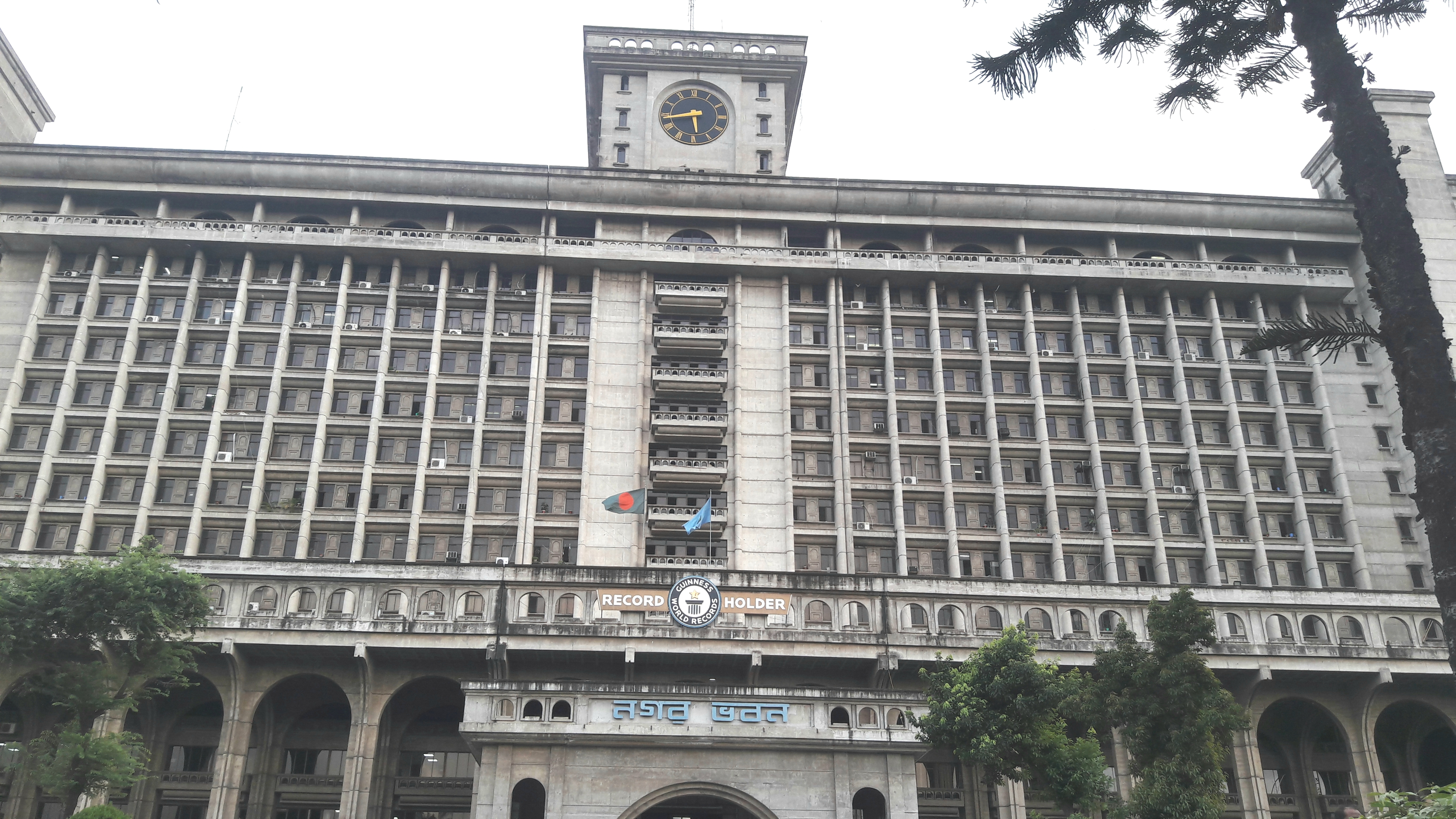
Dhaka (South) City Corporation

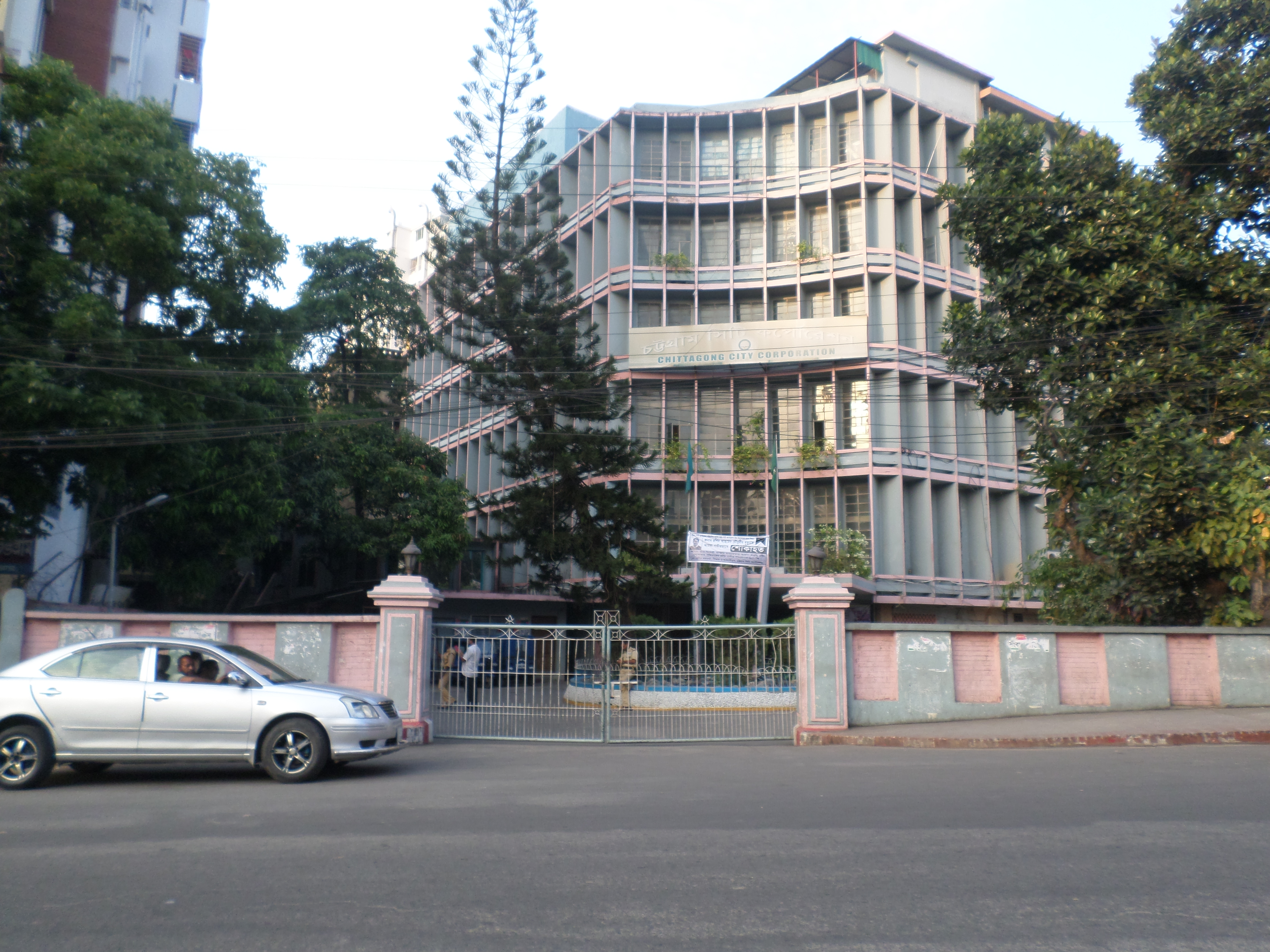
Chattogram City Corporation

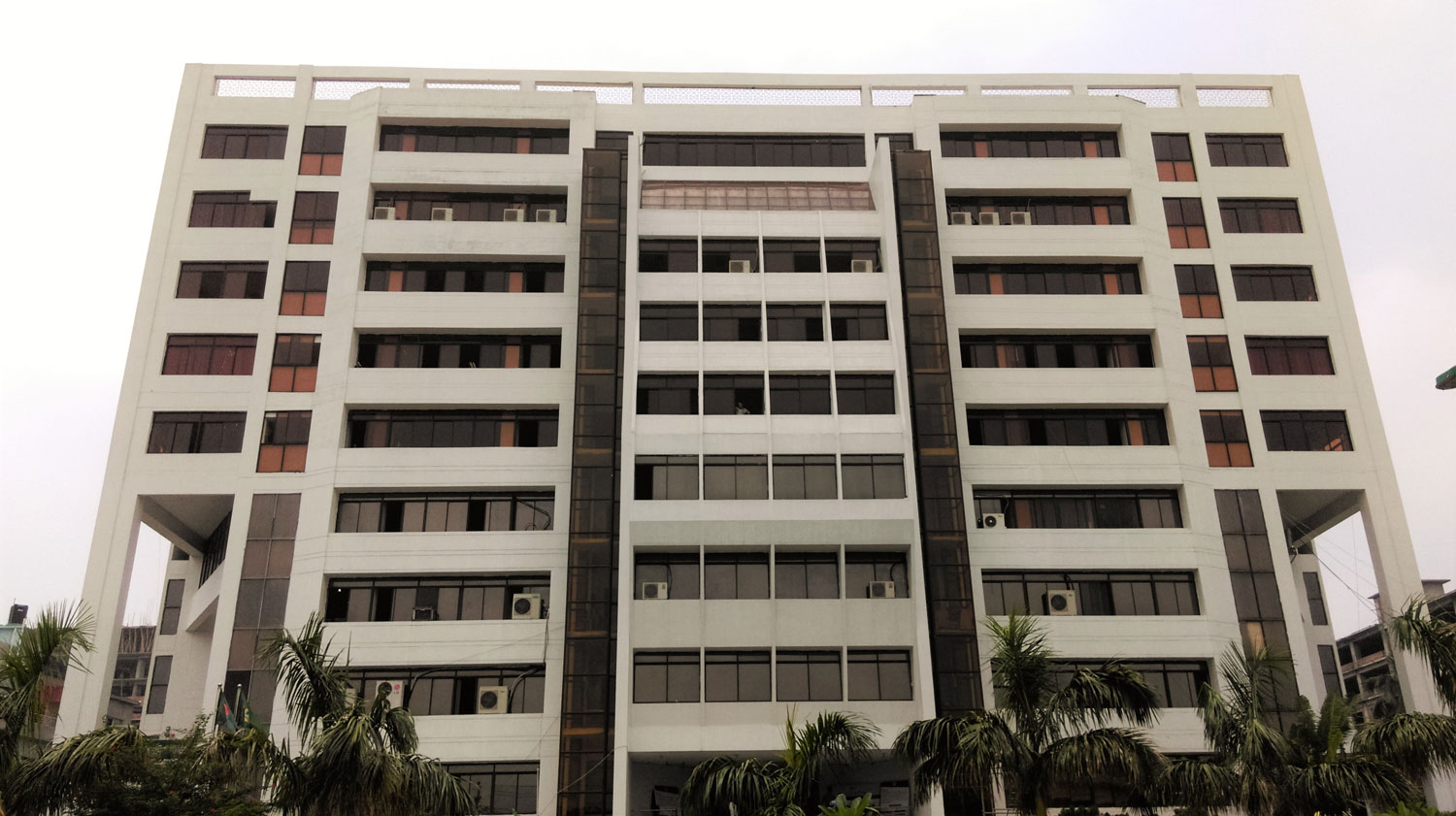
Rajshahi City Corporation

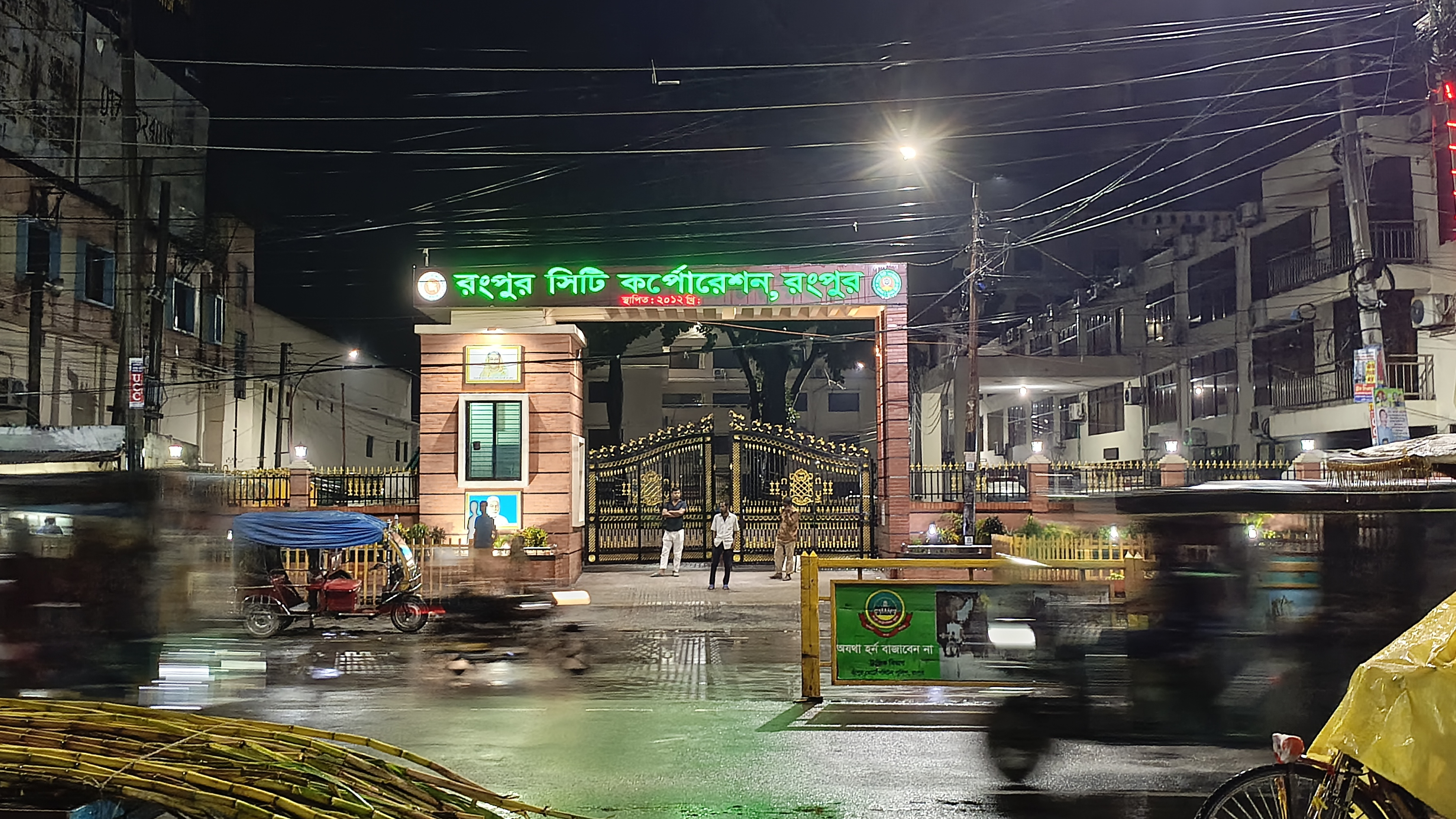
Rangpur City Corporation

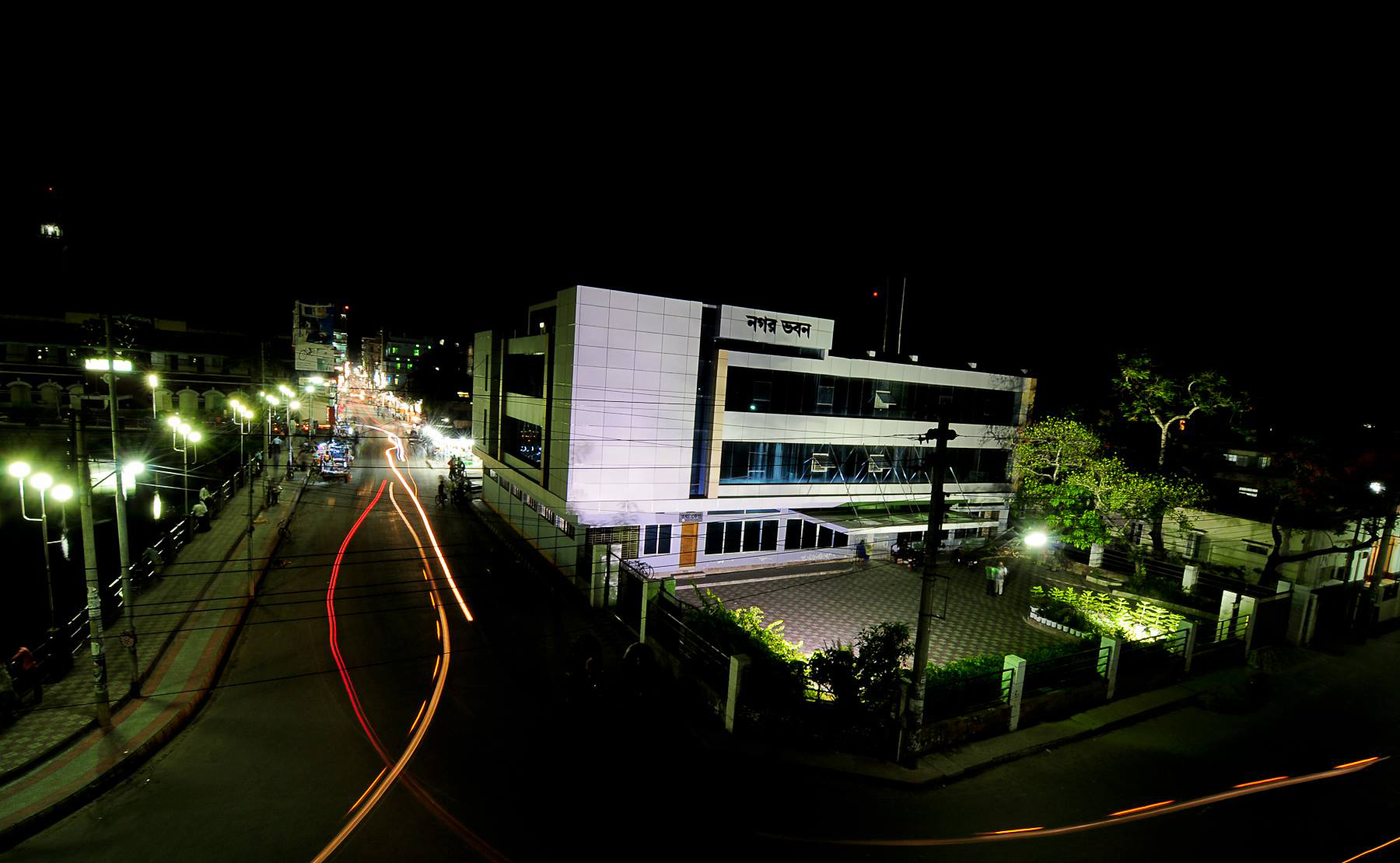
Barishal City Corporation

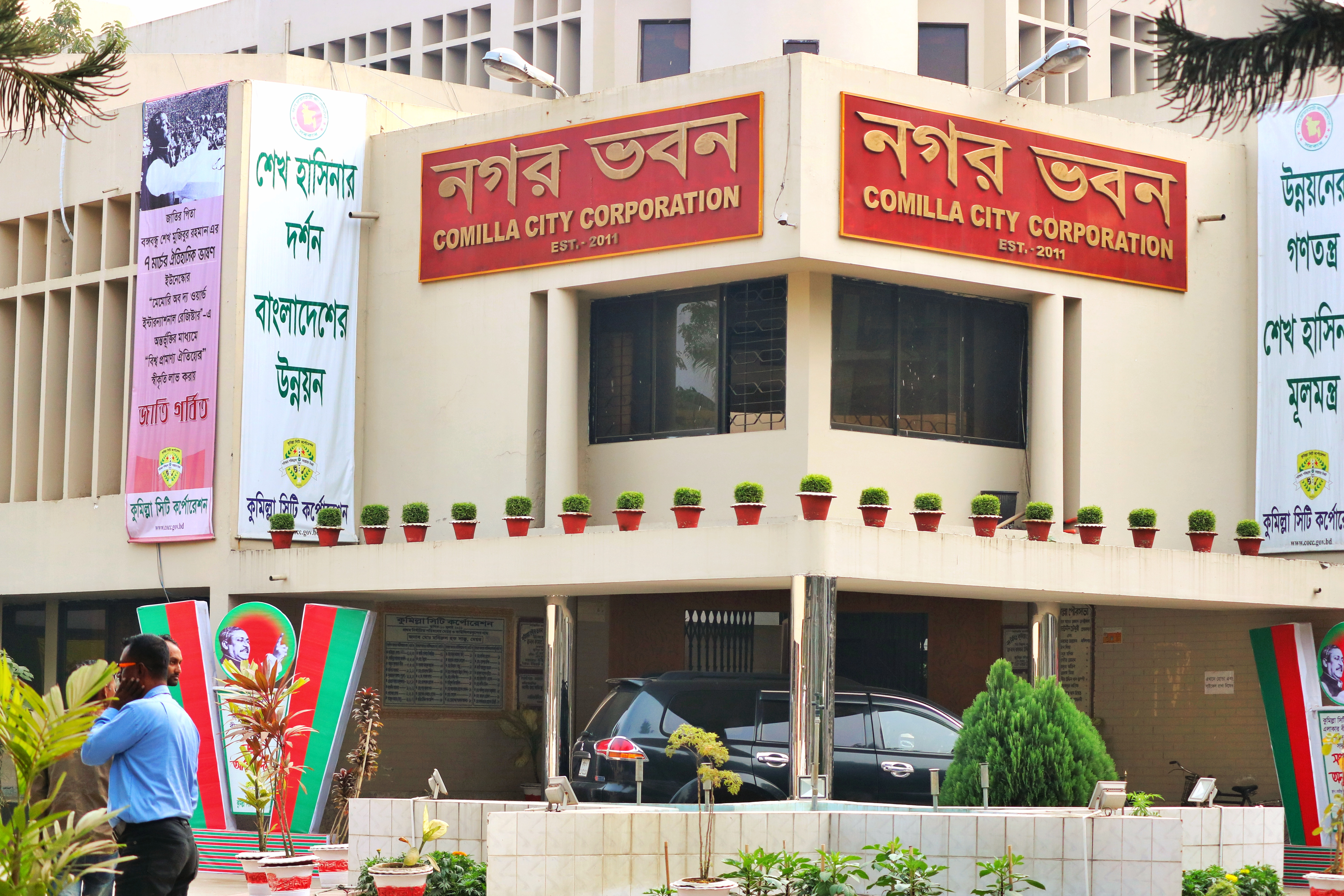
Cumilla City Corporation

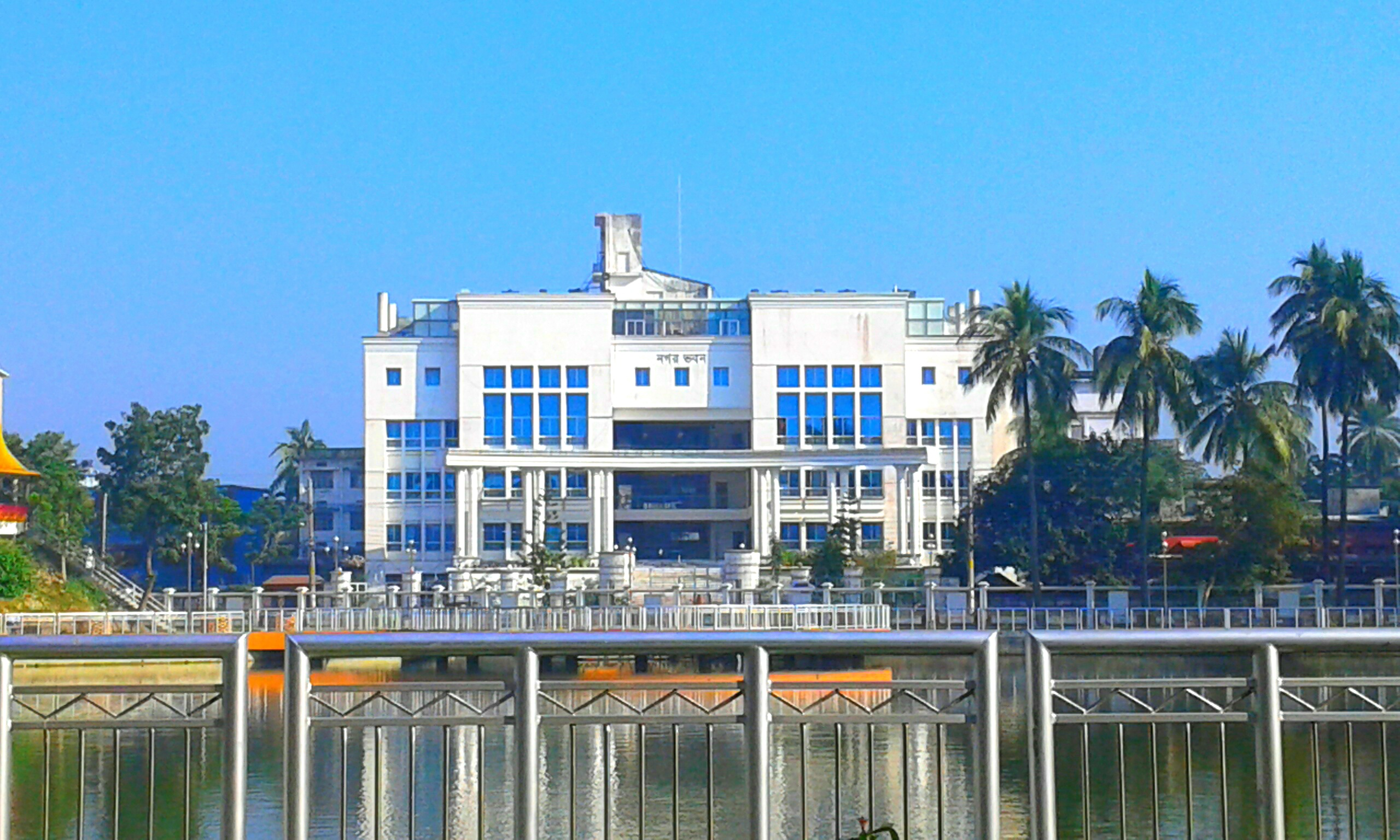
Khulna City Corporation

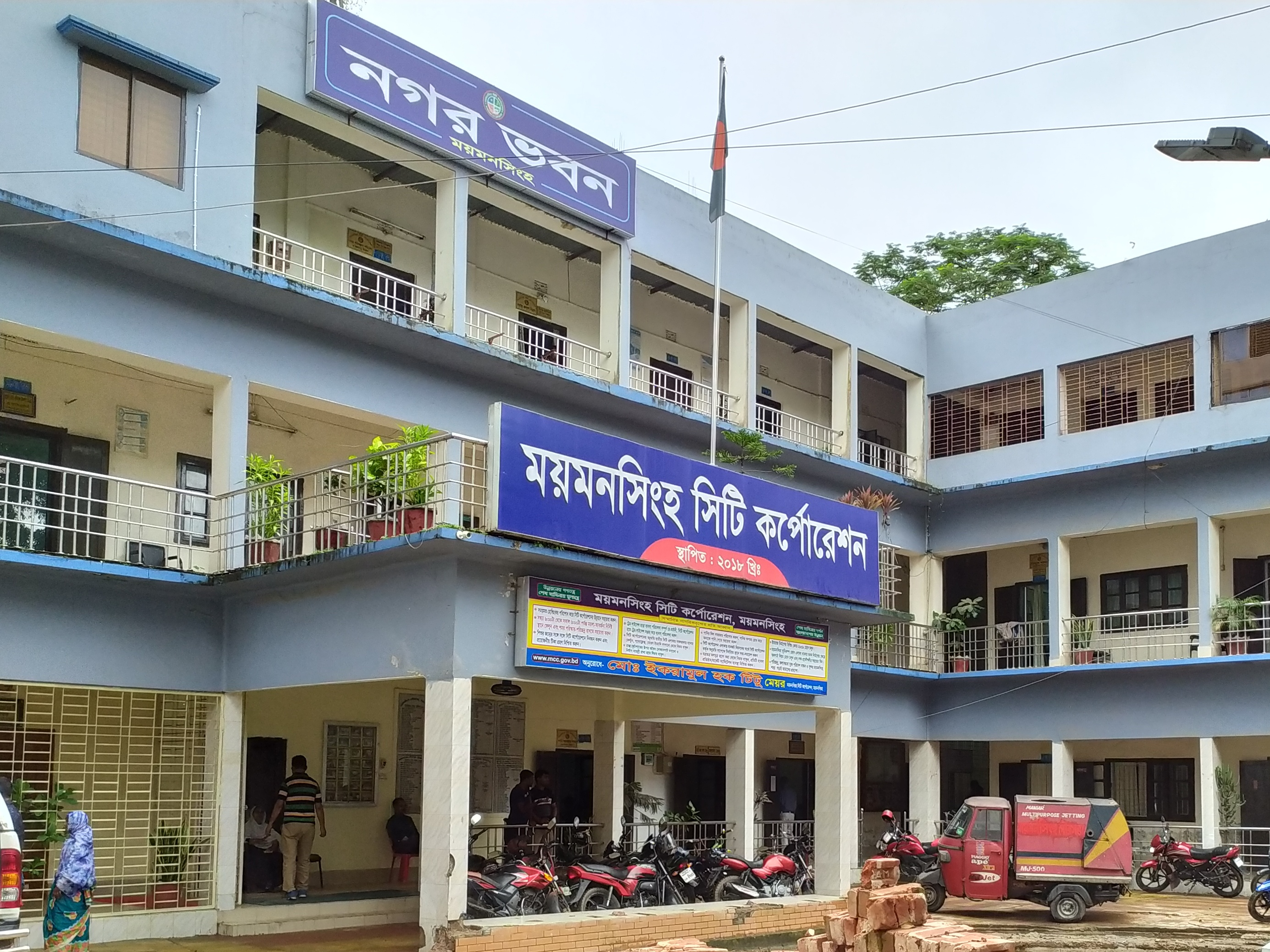
Mymensingh City Corporation

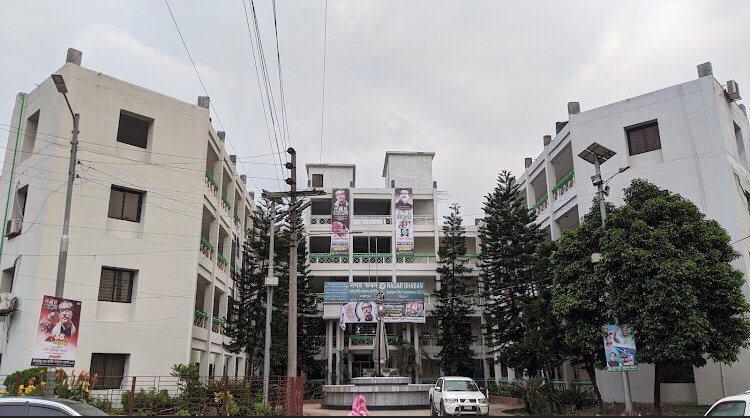
Gazipur City Corporation

== Former city corporations ==
- Dhaka City Corporation (DCC)

== Proposed city corporations ==
- Cox's Bazar City Corporation
- Savar City Corporation

== See also ==
- List of municipal corporations in Bangladesh
- List of cities and towns in Bangladesh
