= Savar City Corporation =

Local governing body of Bangladesh

Savar City Corporation সাভার সিটি কর্পোরেশন

Type
- Type: City Corporation

History
- Founded: TBD

Leadership
- Mayor: Vacant since 19 August 2024
- Deputy Mayor: Vacant since 19 August 2024
- Chief Executive Officer: Vacant since 19 August 2024

Structure
- Seats: TBD
- Length of term: Up to five years

Elections
- Voting system: First past the post
- Next election: TBD

Meeting place
- Nagar Bhaban, Savar

Savar City Corporation (Bengali: সাভার সিটি কর্পোরেশন, romanized: Savar Siti Korporeshon; abbreviated as SVCC) is a proposed city corporation in Bangladesh, announced by the Government of Bangladesh to enhance urban governance in the rapidly growing areas of Savar and Ashulia. Located about 30 km northwest of Dhaka, Savar is a major industrial and residential hub. The proposed city corporation aims to merge Savar Municipality with parts of Ashulia to address urbanization challenges and improve municipal services.

== Geography and administration ==
The proposed Savar City Corporation encompasses the existing Savar Municipality and parts of Ashulia, both located in the Dhaka Division of Bangladesh. Savar is situated approximately 30 kilometers northwest of Dhaka. This initiative aims to streamline governance and urban planning in the rapidly developing areas. The initiative is part of a broader government effort to improve urban management in the region.

== See also ==
- List of city corporations in Bangladesh
- Savar
- Ashulia
- Dhaka District
