= Gokul Medh =

- গোকুল মেধ (Bengali)
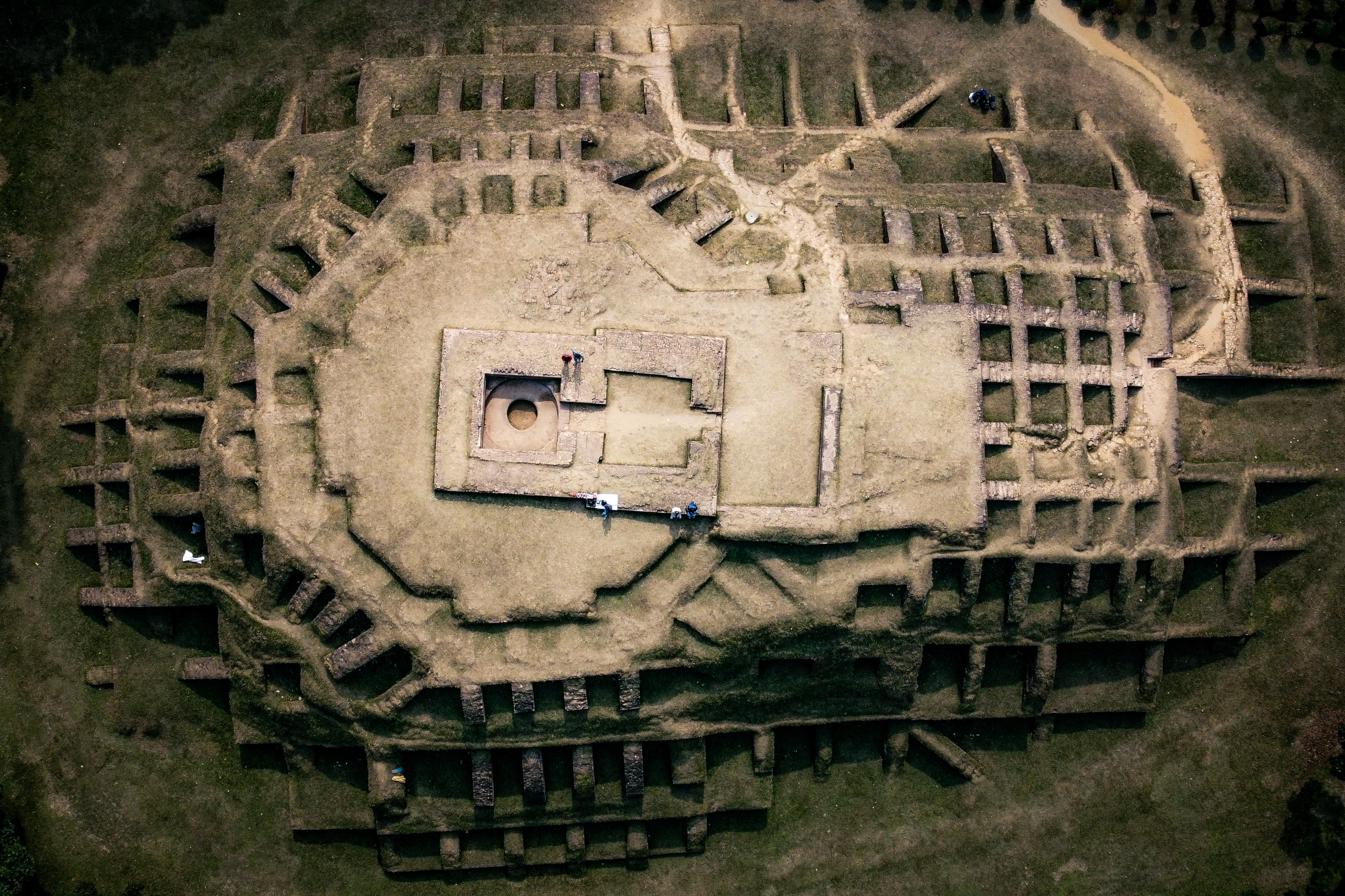
- Gokul Medh or Lakshindar Medh

- Gokul Medh is in Bogra, Bangladesh Gokul Medh (Bangladesh)
- 24.9363°N 89.3364°E
- Location: Bogra, Bangladesh

History
- Built: Between 7th and 11th century AD

Site notes
- Architectural styles: Gupta, Pala

Gokul Medh is an archaeological site in Bangladesh. It is an excavated mound in the village of Gokul in Bogra Sadar Upazila, Bogra, about 2 km southwest of Mahasthangarh. It is also known as Lakshindar Medh, as it is known in local Bengali folklore as the bridal chamber of Behula and Lakshinder, protagonists of an old Bengali ballad. The mound served as the base of a Buddhist shrine or stupa built from the 7th century AD onwards.

== History ==
The site was excavated in 1934-36 by archaeologist N. G. Majumdar. The excavation revealed the base of a stupa built in the terraced cellular style of construction. The base consists of 172 tightly packed blind rectangular cells and arranged in gradually rising tiers to support a polygonal shrine above it. The site features several Terracotta plaques from the late Gupta period as well as a square temple added later in the Sena period. During excavation, a stone-slab was discovered at the center of the shrine, which had twelve shallow depressions surrounding a larger depression at the center containing a tiny gold leaf with the figure of a recumbent bull in relief. This indicates the shrine's use as a Shiva temple at some point.

== Gallery ==
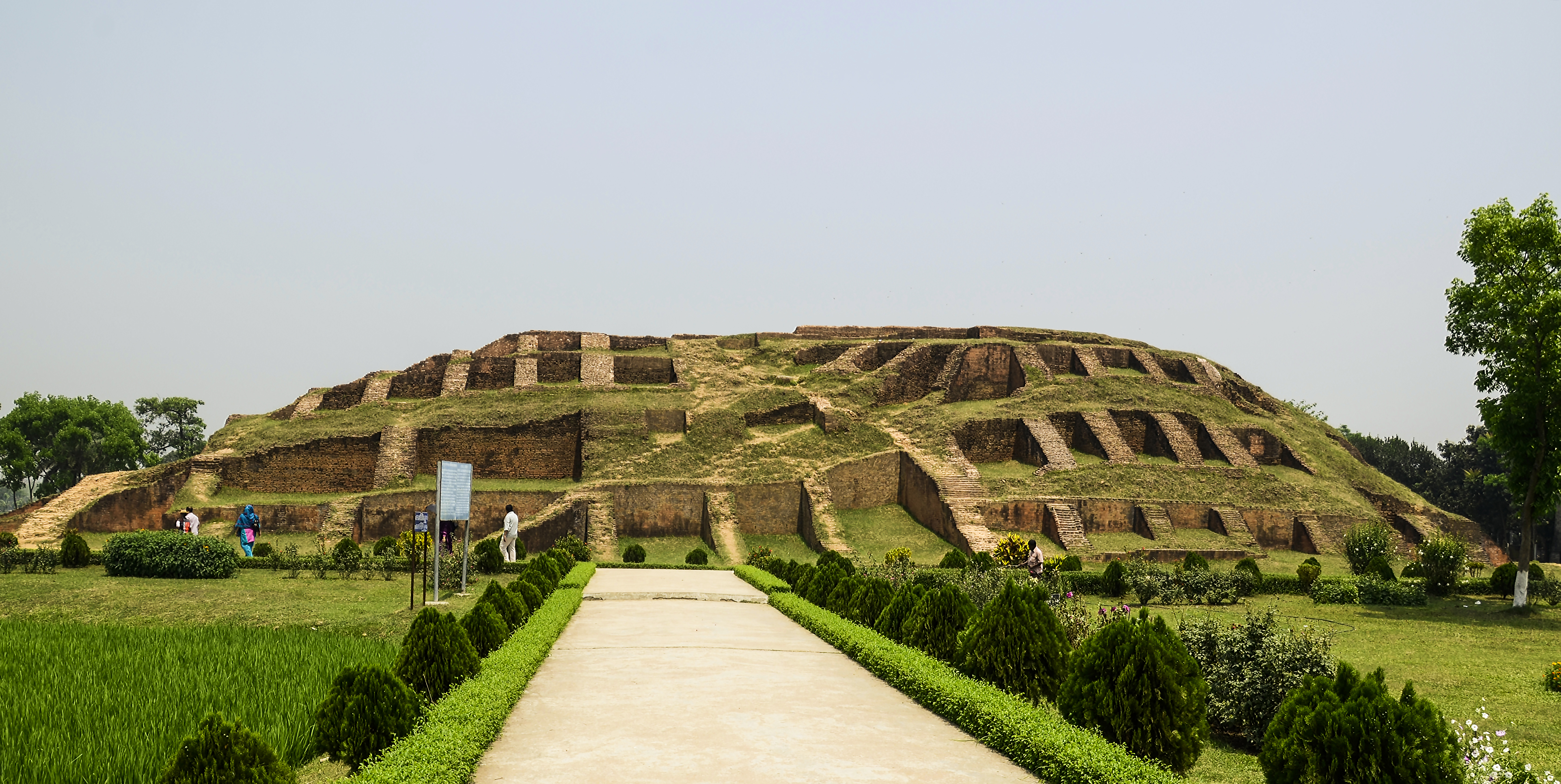

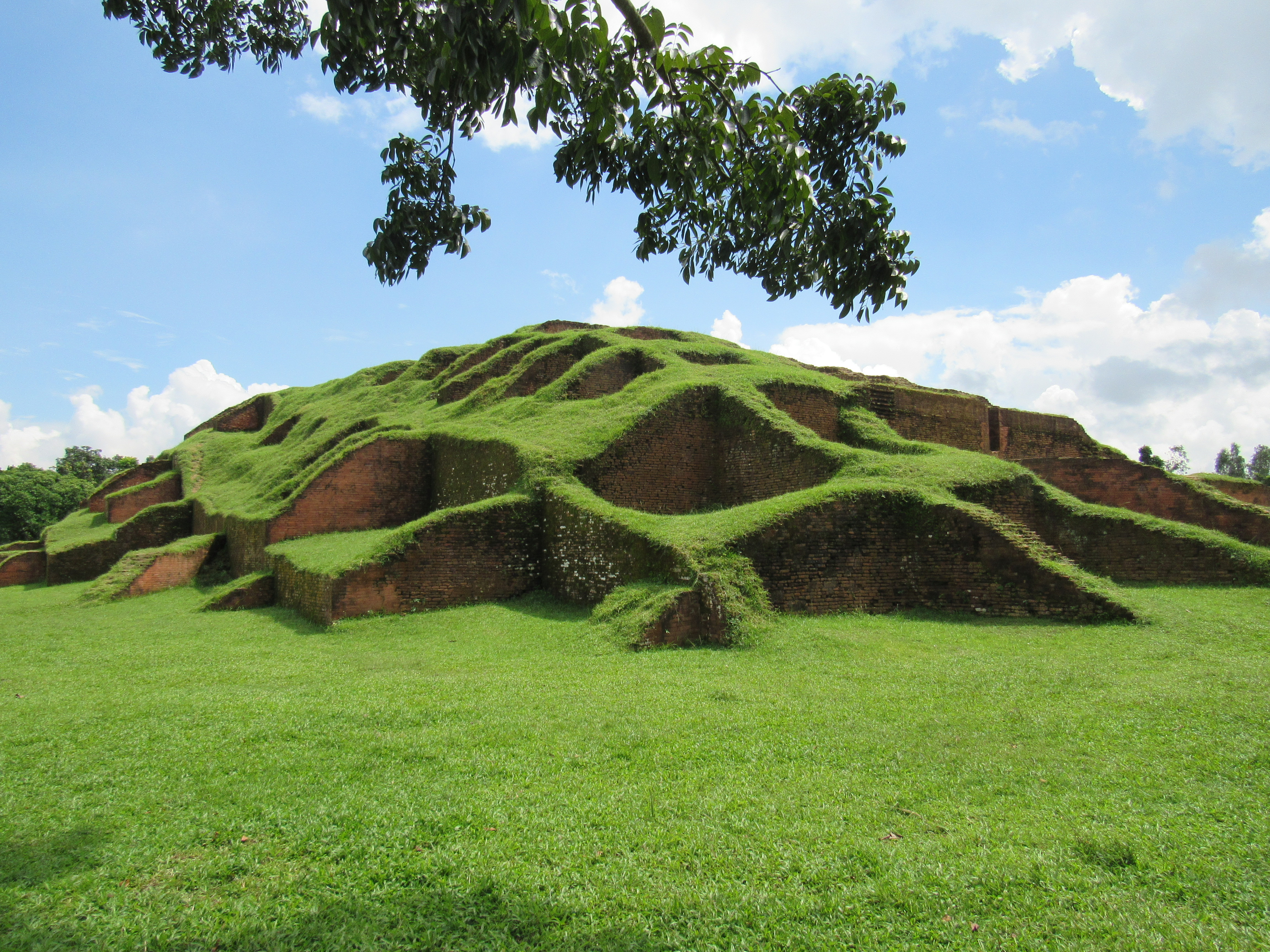

== See also ==
- List of archaeological sites in Bangladesh
- History of Bangladesh
