= Bangla QR =

National interoperable QR code payment standard in Bangladesh

- Product type: Interoperable QR code payment standard
- Current owner: Bangladesh Bank
- Produced by: Bangladesh Bank
- Country: Bangladesh
- Introduced: January 18, 2023
- Website: www.bb.org.bd

Bangla QR is the national interoperable Quick Response (QR) code standard for retail payments in Bangladesh. Bangladesh Bank launched Bangla QR on 18 January 2023, to consolidate the country's fragmented retail payment systems. The system allows merchants to accept digital payments from various commercial banks, payment service providers, and Mobile Financial Services (MFS) networks through a single QR code. On 1 July 2026, the deployment of the universal standard became mandatory for all scheduled banks and mobile financial operators in Bangladesh.

== History ==
=== Early Phase ===
Before a unified standard existed, mobile financial services (MFS) providers and banks in Bangladesh operated separate quick response (QR) payment networks. Merchants had to display different QR codes for each digital wallet or app.

To resolve this issue, Bangladesh Bank introduced the "National QR Code Standard for Retail Payments in Bangladesh." The standard used international EMVCo specifications. This allowed a single QR code to process transactions from different banks and MFS wallets.

The central bank launched the system under the name "Bangla QR" on 18 January 2023. Commercial banks and MFS providers like bKash and Nagad joined the network during the initial phase. Bangladesh Bank removed daily transaction limits for retail Bangla QR payments in February 2024 to support higher-value transactions.

=== Mandatory adoption and service expansion (2026) ===
Bangladesh Bank made the Bangla QR standard mandatory for all scheduled banks, financial institutions, and MFS operators starting 1 July 2026. To comply with this directive, financial institutions were required to replace their old proprietary codes with the universal standard.

Concurrently, to standardize costs across the digital payment ecosystem, Bangladesh Bank initially capped the Merchant Discount Rate (MDR) at a maximum of 1.15% (with a minimum floor of 1%) for all Bangla QR transactions processed through the national switch. This regulatory cap was introduced to replace the widely varying commission rates previously charged by individual payment networks, strictly ensuring that the digital payment service remained completely free of charge for end consumers. However, in an effort to further boost micro-merchant adoption, the central bank issued a subsequent circular in August 2026 removing the minimum MDR floor entirely, allowing acquiring institutions to waive merchant fees altogether.

The transition saw immediate high volume; central bank data showed that the platform processed 77,165 transactions—totaling ৳220.2 million (Tk 22.02 crore)—within the 48-hour period encompassing the 30 June and 1 July deadline.

To further accelerate micro-merchant adoption and digital financial inclusion, Bangladesh Bank announced new policy incentives and technical features for the platform. Effective 1 October 2026, all Bangla QR transactions up to ৳2,000 will be completely charge-free, effectively eliminating fees on everyday small retail purchases.

Additionally, the network's capabilities will expand beyond retail payments with the introduction of interoperable Person-to-Person (P2P) transactions via Bangla QR, scheduled to launch on 1 November 2026.

== Technical architecture and operation ==
Bangla QR operates under the National Payment Switch Bangladesh (NPSB), serving as a central clearinghouse to ensure interoperability across different payment platforms. The system supports secure, contactless payments where the merchant's account directly synchronizes via API integrations. It supports both static QR codes (typically printed for small retail shops) and dynamic QR codes (generated on digital screens or POS machines containing the exact billing amount).

== Network adoption and statistics ==
By the end of 2025, the Bangla QR payment collection system was deployed to approximately 9.63 lakh (963,000) merchants across Bangladesh. The ecosystem supports various commercial banks, Mobile Financial Services (MFS) like bKash and Nagad, and Payment Service Providers (PSPs). Standard Chartered Bangladesh, among other major institutions, announced its full integration with the NPSB for Bangla QR payments in 2025.

== Regulatory policies and settlements ==
To accelerate the goal of a cashless society, the government tied the adoption of Bangla QR to business licensing, making it mandatory for obtaining or renewing trade licenses issued by city corporations and municipalities.

To encourage micro-merchant adoption by improving their daily liquidity, Bangladesh Bank approved instant settlement for Bangla QR transactions, which went into effect on 15 December 2025. The central bank also set a minimum merchant discount rate (MDR) of 1 percent for payments processed through the NPSB.

A central bank directive mandated all banks, MFS, and PSPs to replace their proprietary QR codes with the interoperable Bangla QR standard by 30 June 2026. The mandatory unified standard officially came into effect on 1 July 2026. Institutions failing to transition their merchant networks to the universal standard face a maximum penalty of up to Tk 30 lakh per violating institution.

== See Also ==
National Payment Switch Bangladesh
