= Vasu Vihara =

Vasu Vihara Vasu Bihar
- ভাসু বিহার (Bengali)
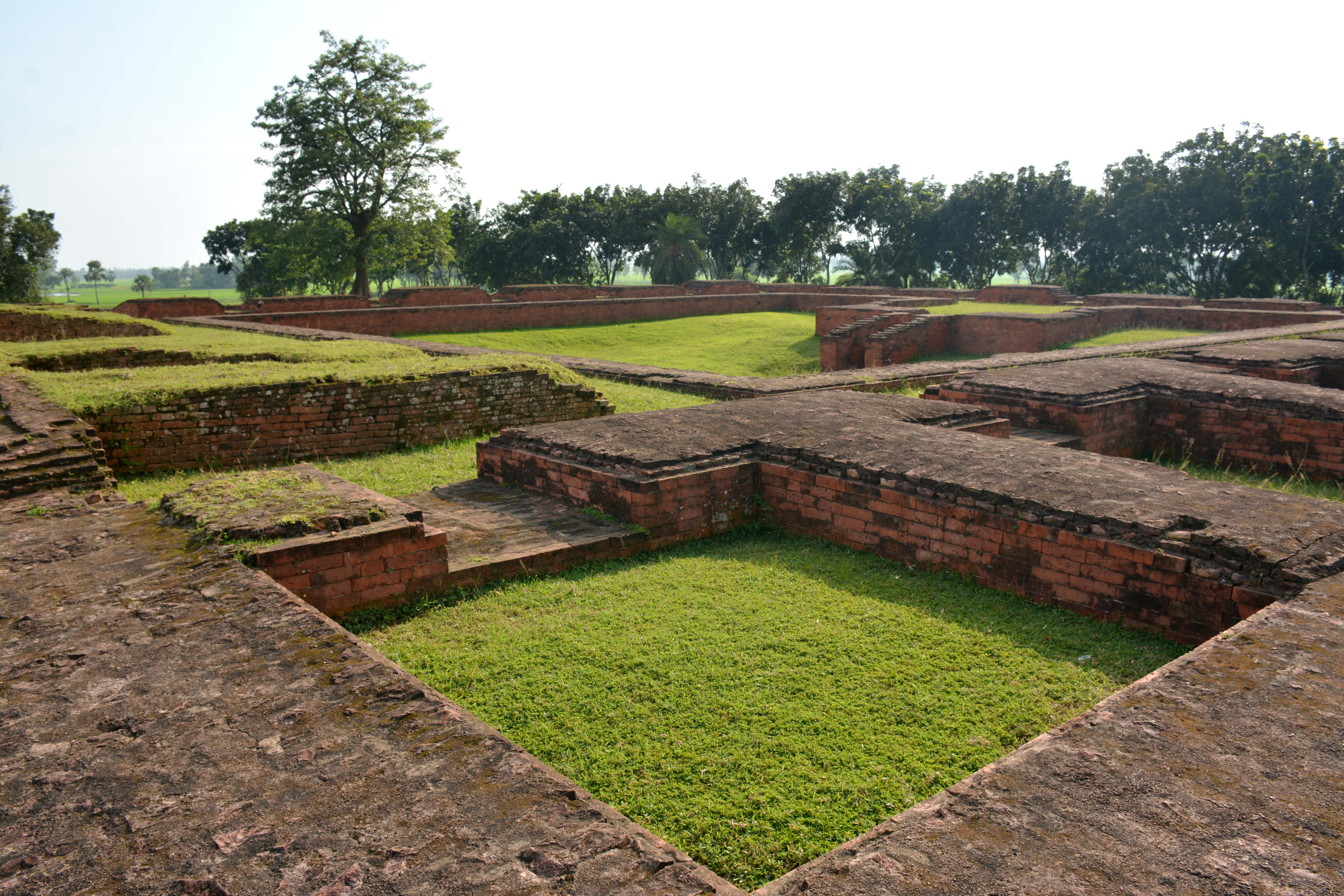
- Narapatir Dhap (Vashu Bihar)

- Vashu Vihara is in Bogra, Bangladesh
- 24.9828°N 89.2978°E
- Location: Bogra, Bangladesh

History
- Built: 8th century AD

Site notes
- Architectural styles: Gupta, Pala

Vasu Vihara or Vasu Bihar is a famous archaeological site in Bangladesh. It is locally popularly known as Narapatir Dhap. It is one of the ancient Buddhist heritage of Bangladesh.

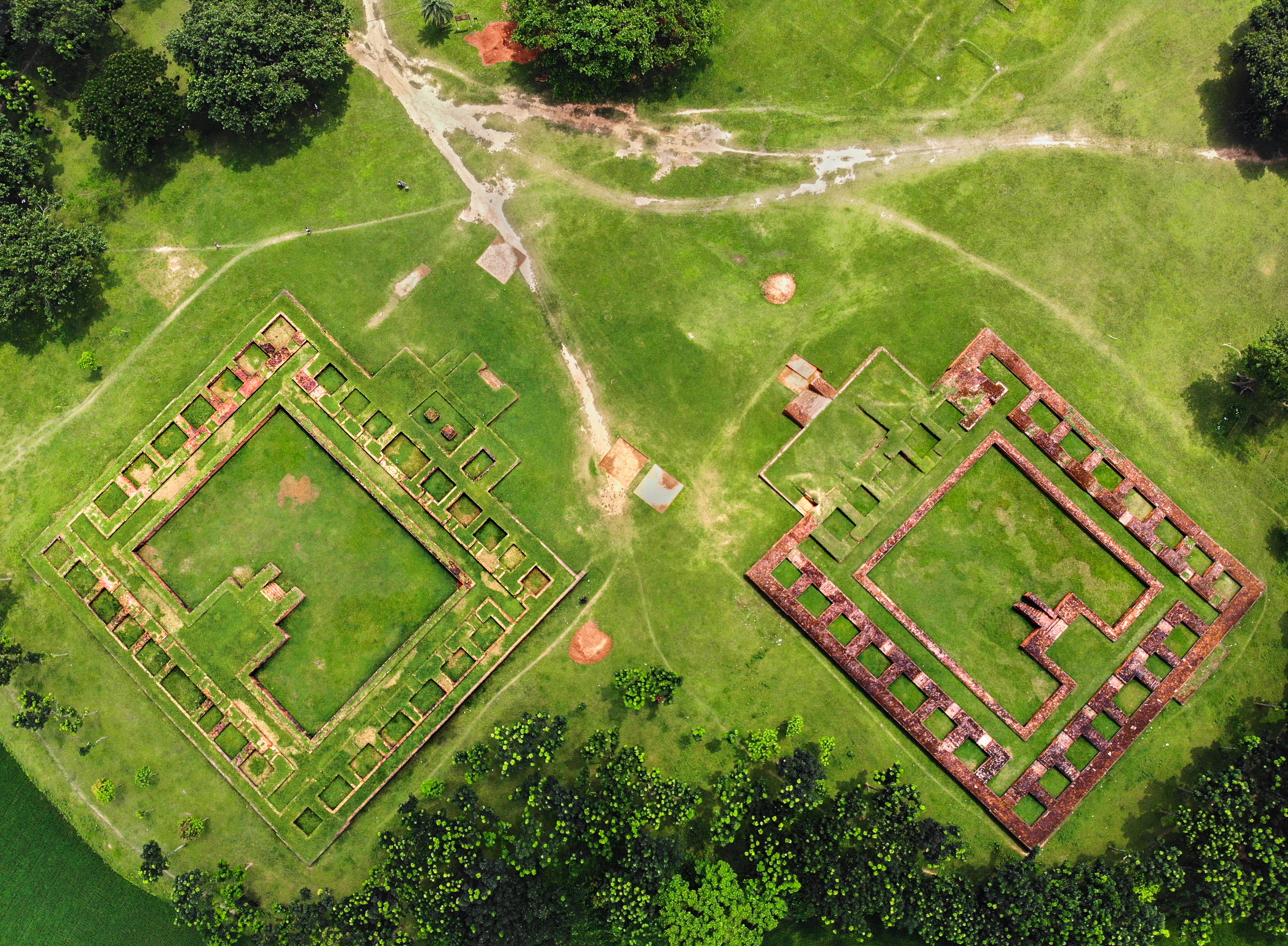
Vasu Bihar, Bogra

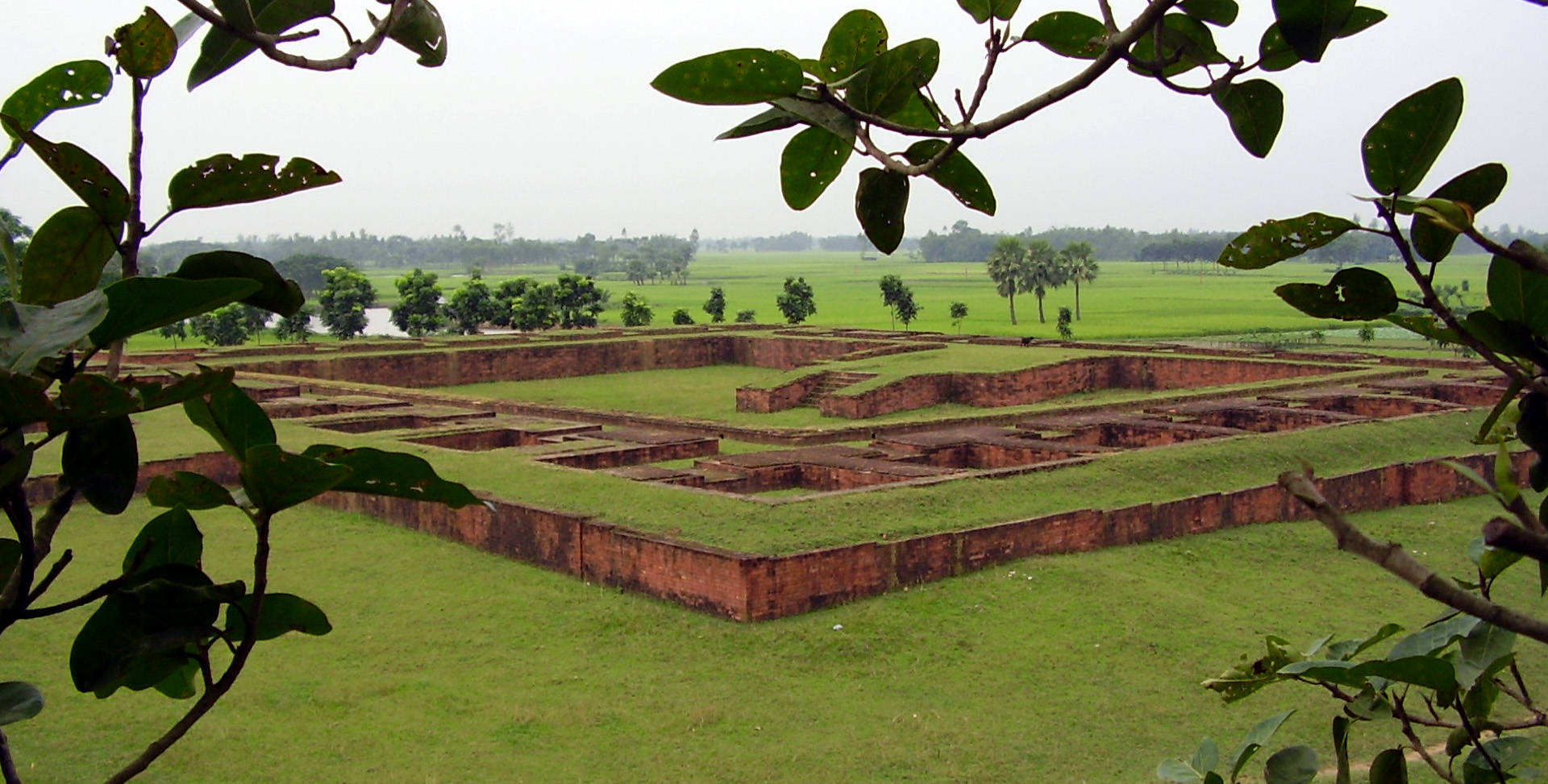
Monastery of Vasu Bihara, Bogra

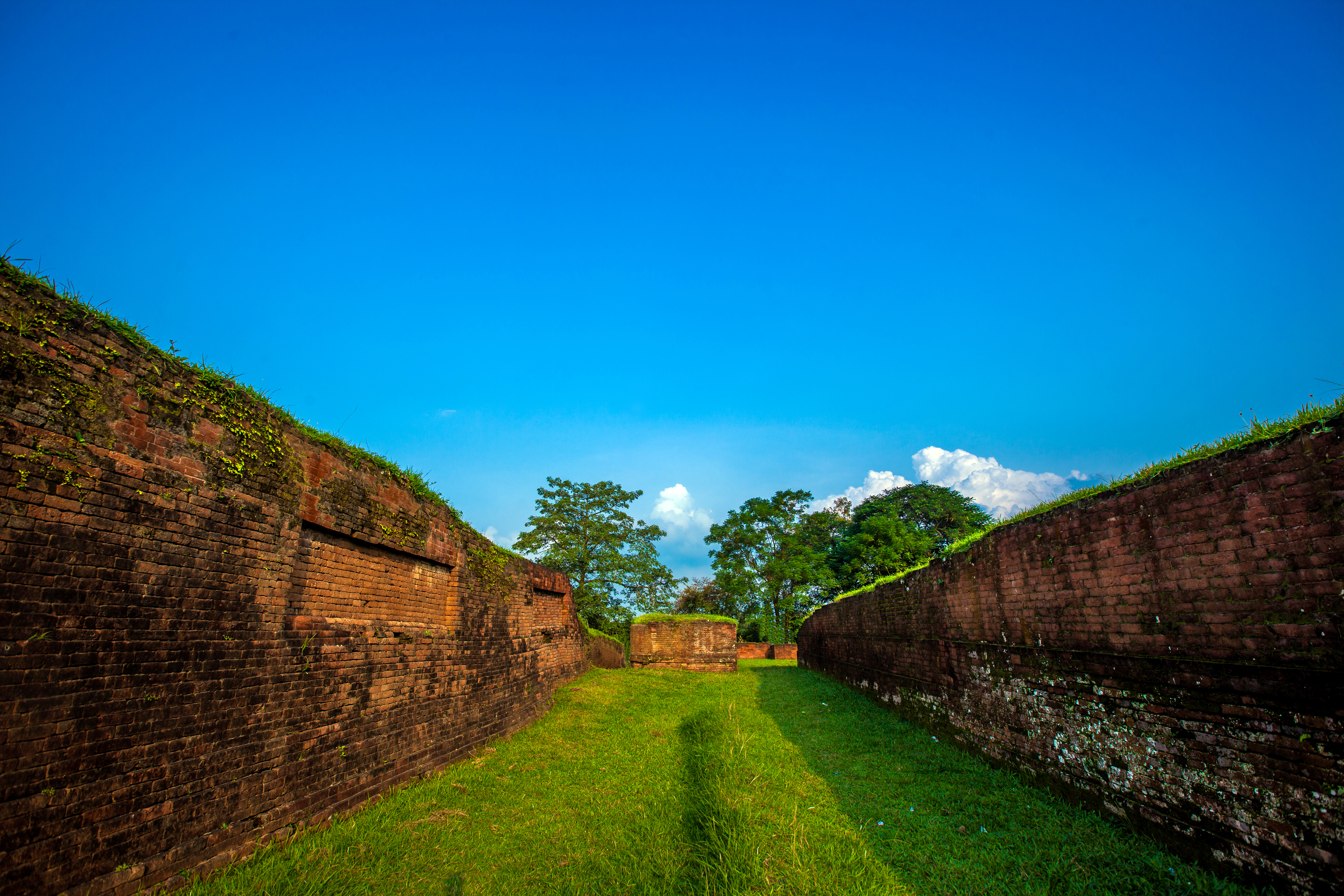
View of monastery

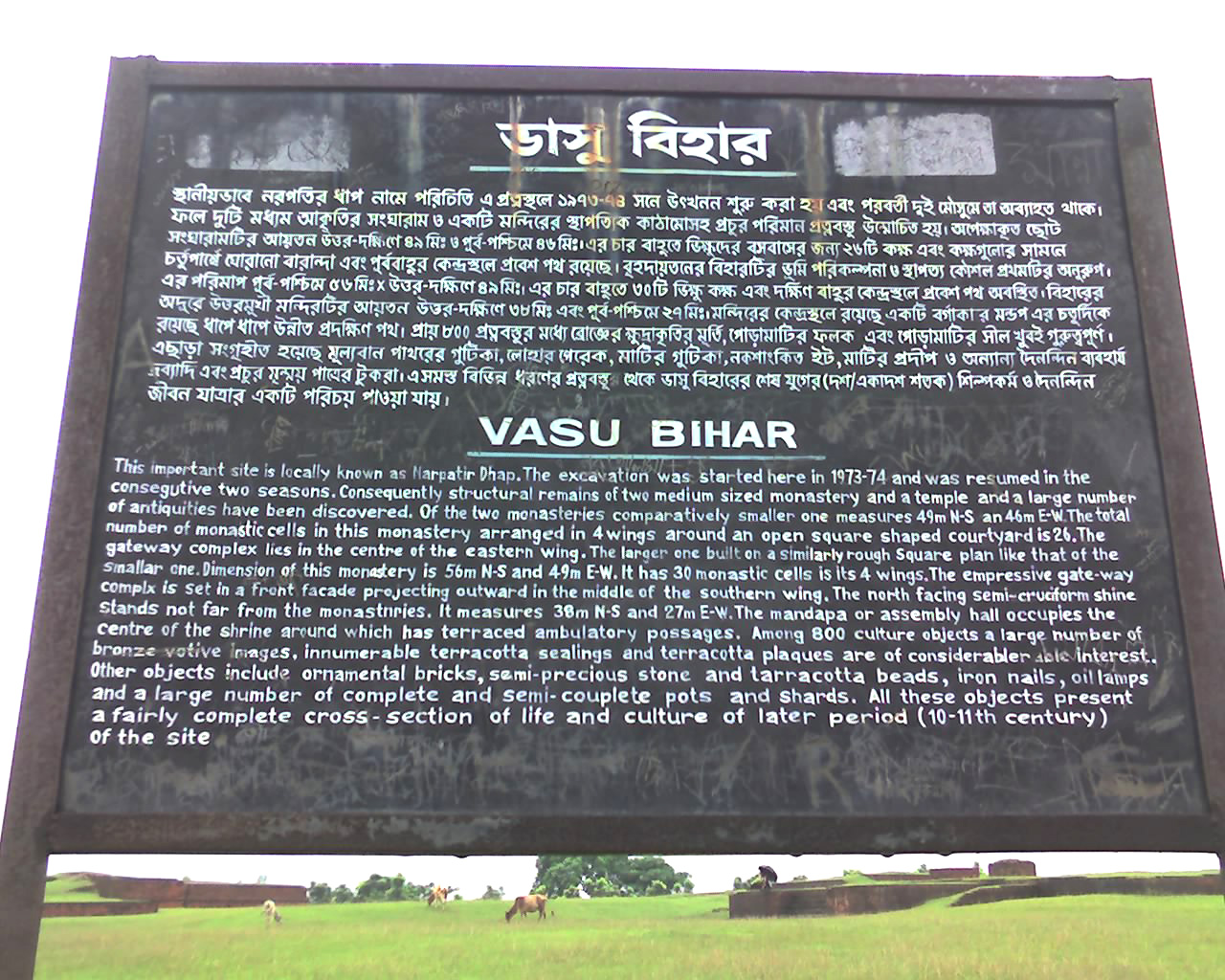
Site brief by Department of Archaeology

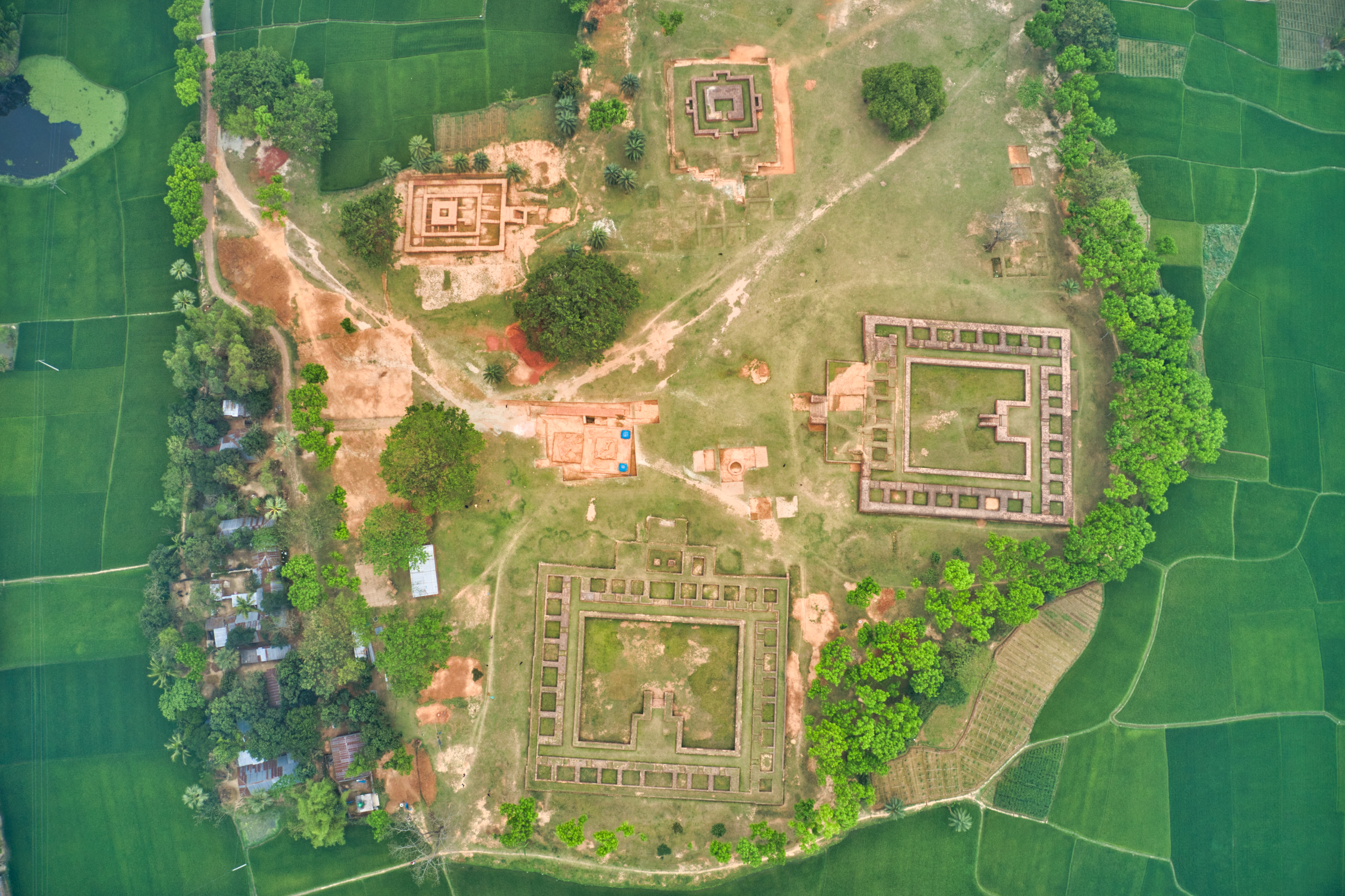
Aerial view of Vasu Bihar

== Location ==
It is situated in Shibganj Upazila of Bogra. It is located 6 kilometers west of Mahasthangarh.

== History ==
In 1973–74, the excavation was started here and in the consecutive two session it was resumed. 18 ancient clay seals, mostly from the Pala dynasty, and two brick-built structures has been discovered by the archaeologists during an excavation.

== Description ==
This complex has five mounds. Three of them are large and rest two are small. The small monastery is 49 meters north–south and east–west 46 meters. There are six rooms of the monks in the four-arm of it. Front side of the rooms is surrounded by a veranda and there is an entrance in the middle of the east side. The big monastery also looks like the small monastery, but is larger in area and has more rooms. There is an open space among the surroundings of the small rooms of the monks. It seems there was an auditorium in the open space. Nearly 800 antique have been found here. Among them miniature statues, plaques and seals, beads of precious stones, ornamental bricks and tablets, clay lamps, including vessel fragments are notable.

== See also ==
- List of archaeological sites in Bangladesh
