= Standard Chartered Bangladesh =

Bangladeshi financial services company

Standard Chartered Bank
- Type: Private company
- Industry: Financial services
- Founded: 1948, through Grindlays 1905; 121 years ago
- Headquarters: 67 Gulshan Avenue, Dhaka, Bangladesh
- Key people: Enamul Huque (CEO)
- Products: Credit cards; Consumer banking; Corporate banking; Mortgage loans; Wealth management
- Parent: Standard Chartered
- Website: sc.com/bd

Standard Chartered Bangladesh (officially M/S Standard Chartered Bank Bangladesh Pvt. Ltd.) is a banking and financial services company headquartered in Dhaka, Bangladesh and a wholly owned subsidiary of Standard Chartered. Standard Chartered has been operating in Bangladesh for over a hundred years.

Standard Chartered Bank is currently promoting Saadiq Banking. Standard Chartered Bank Bangladesh has recently, as of January 2014 eased the procedure of getting International Credit Card and have come into competition by providing Visa and Master cards.

While private banks like Dutch Bangla Bank Limited and BRAC Bank Limited have booths all over the country, the bank is holding limited space here though it is one of the largest foreign banks in Bangladesh. It has branches in Bogra, Chittagong, Dhaka, Khulna, Savar and Sylhet. They have ATM booths almost all over Dhaka and Chittagong.

== History ==
After the partition of the subcontinent in 1947, Standard Chartered started its business in what is now Bangladesh in 1948, in the port city of Chittagong.

In a move that Standard Chartered said transformed it into the largest foreign bank in Bangladesh, it acquired Grindlays Bank from ANZ in August 2000. In doing so, it gained an operational history in the country dating back to 1905. In 2005, Standard Chartered bought out the Bangladesh banking operations of American Express.

== At a glance ==
- No. of branches: 24
- No. of ATM: 96
- Established: 1905 (including ANZ Grindlays experience; Standard Chartered Bank originally established its first branch in Chittagong in 1948)
- The oldest and largest foreign bank in Bangladesh
- Only bank that never closed its doors over 110 years of banking operation in the country
- First international bank to extend credit lines to Bangladesh and open the first external letter of credit (LC) in Bangladesh in 1972
