= Bogra =

City in Bangladesh

Bogra বগুড়া (Bengali)
- City
- Bogura
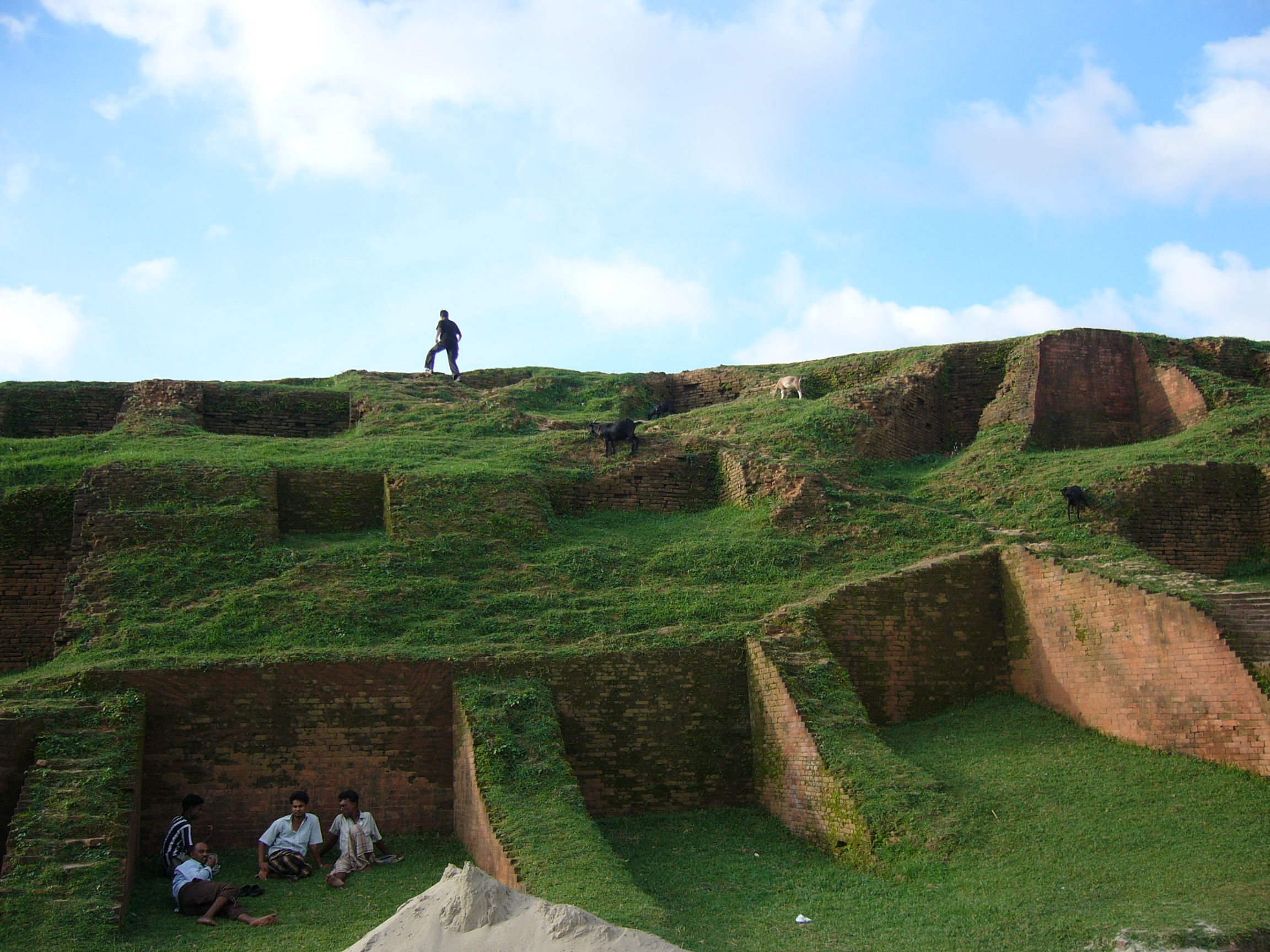
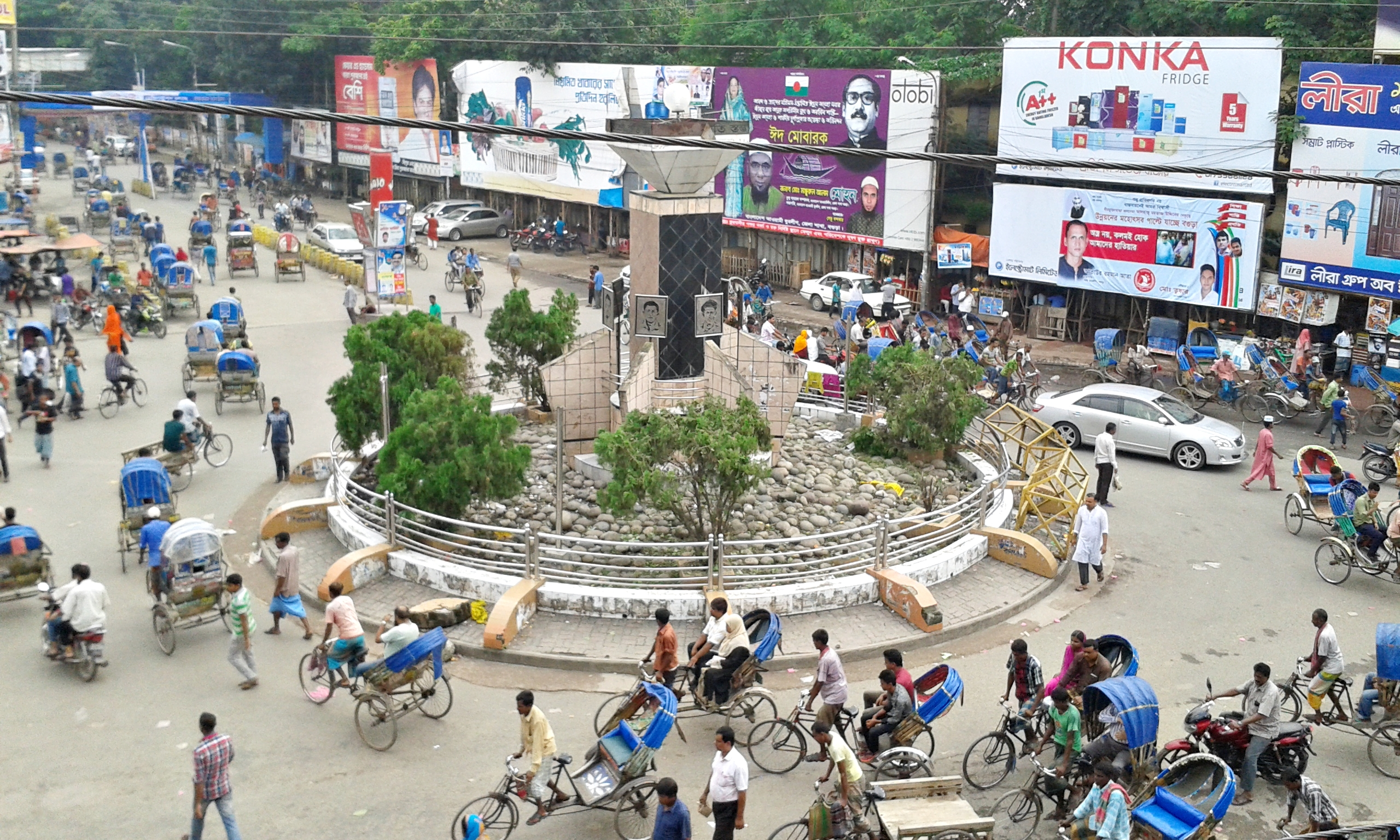
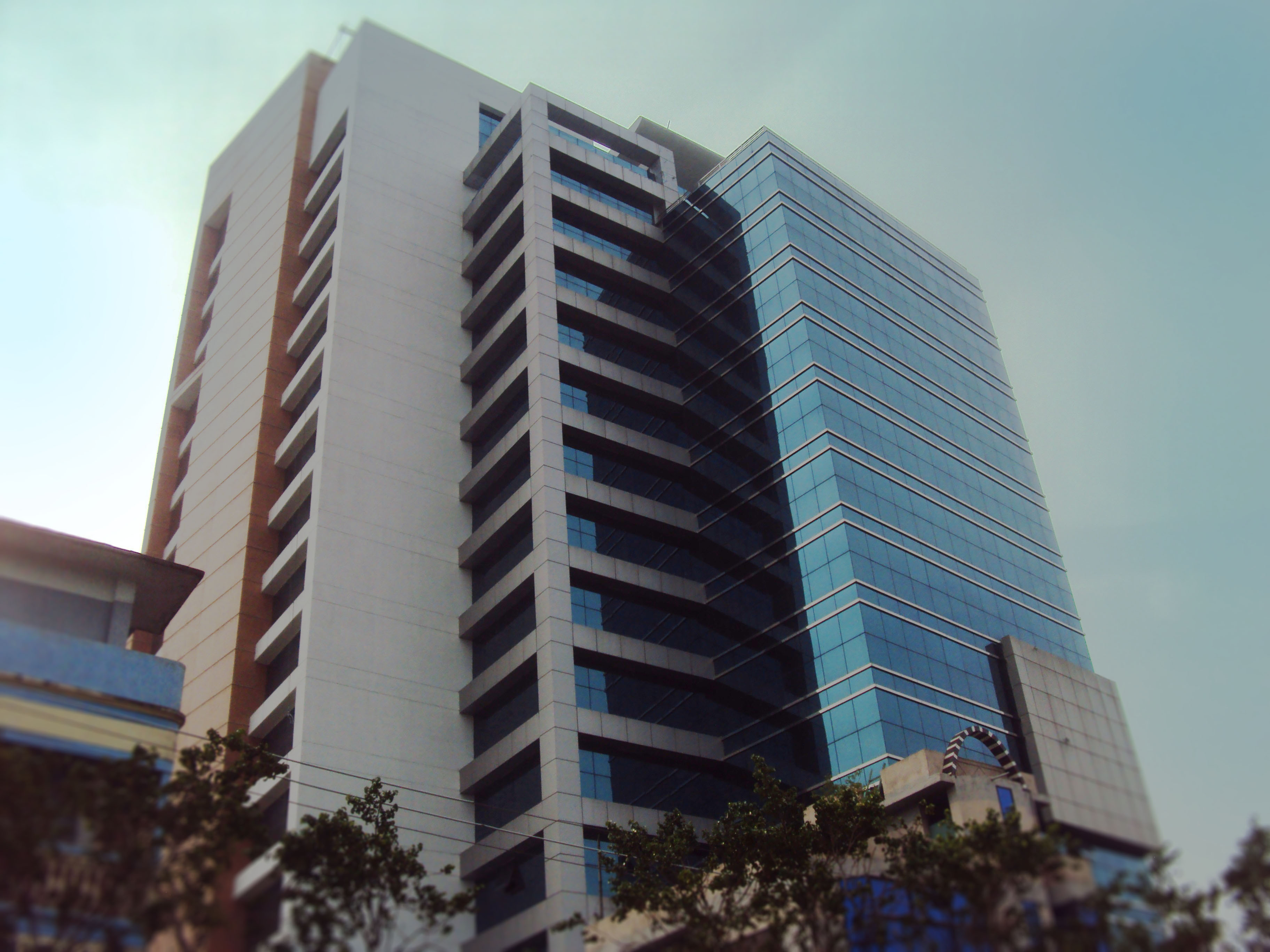
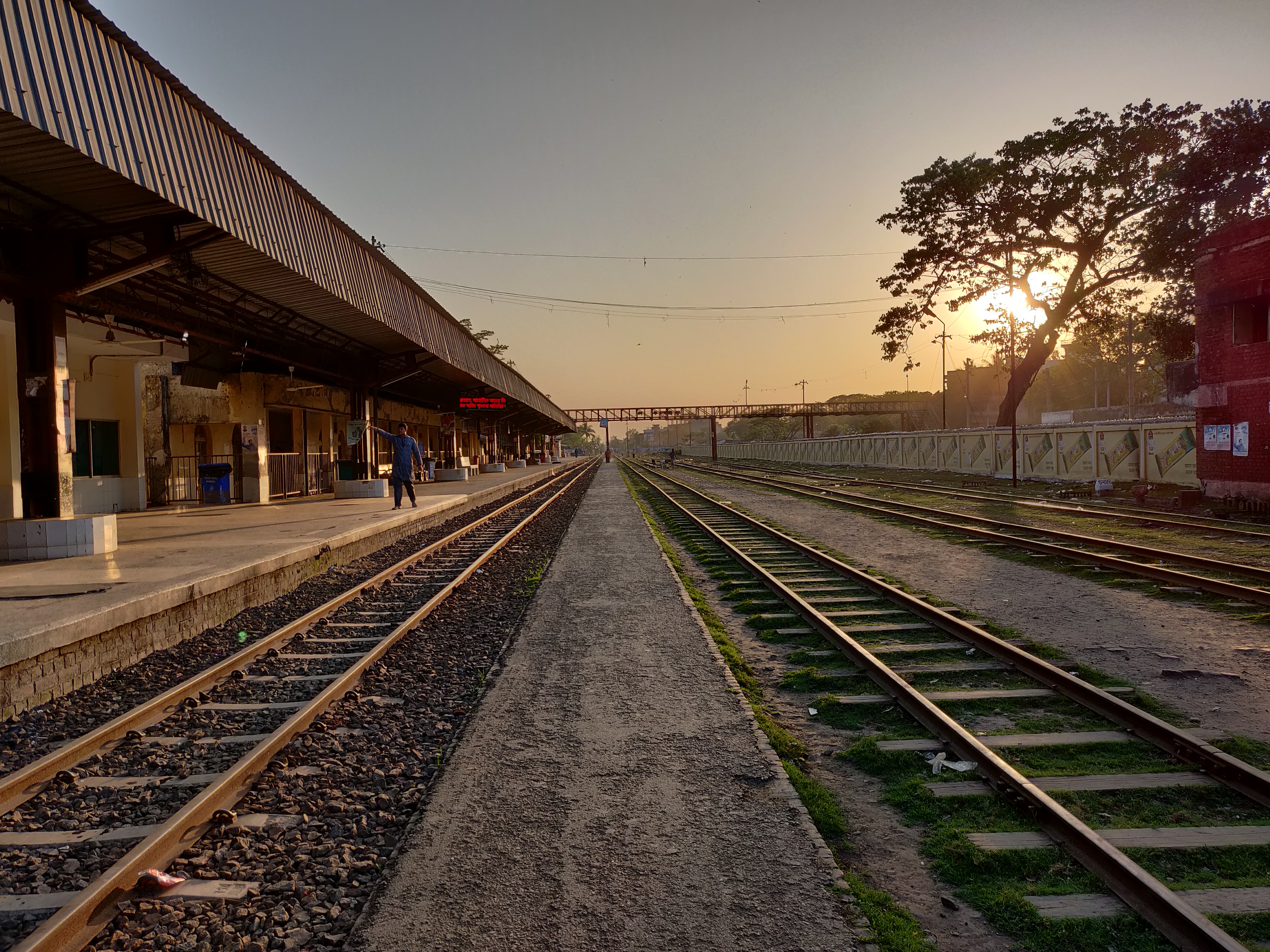
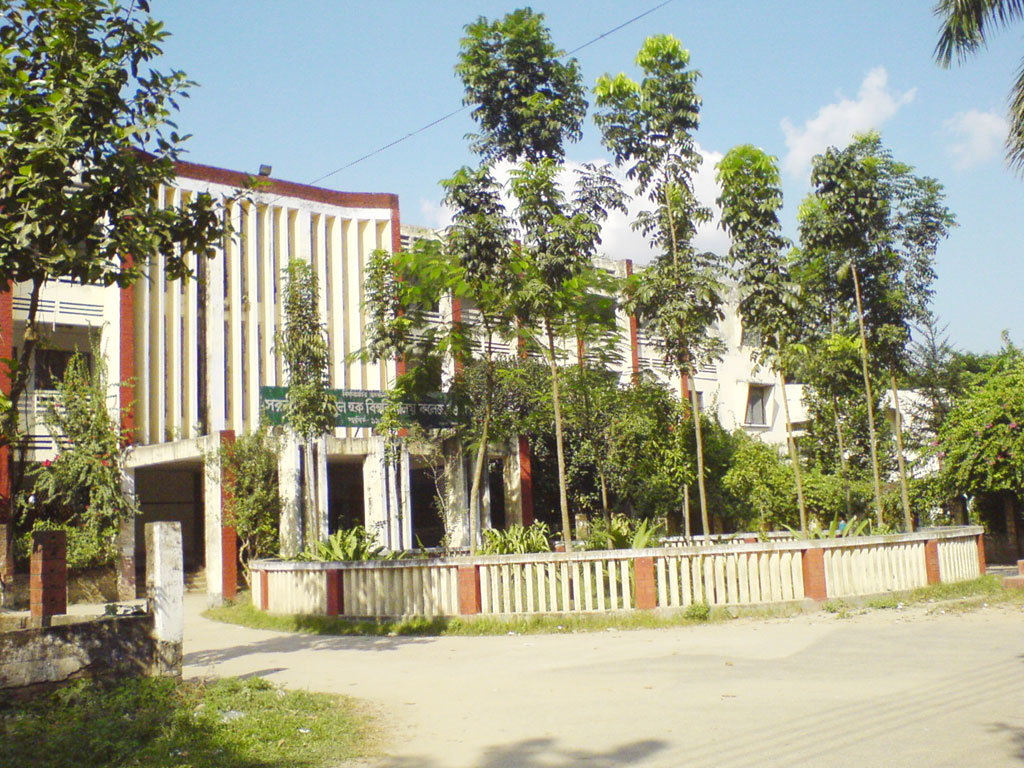
- From top: Gokul Medh, Sathmatha, Delta Tower, Bogra Railway Station, Azizul Haque College

- Location in Rajshahi Division Location in Bangladesh
- Coordinates: 24°51′N 89°22′E
- Country: Bangladesh
- Division: Rajshahi
- District: Bogra
- Pundravardhana: 1280 BC
- Municipal Council: 1 July 1876

Government
  - Type: Mayor–Council
  - Body: Bogura City Corporation
  - City Council: 28 constituencies
  - Parliament: 2 constituencies

Area
  - Urban: 69.56 km^{2} (26.86 sq mi)
  - Metro: 87.14 km^{2} (33.64 sq mi)
- Elevation: 20 m (66 ft)

Population (2022)
  - Urban: 443,742
  - Urban density: 6,379/km^{2} (16,520/sq mi)
  - Metro: 542,420
  - Metro density: 6,225/km^{2} (16,120/sq mi)

Languages
  - Official: Bengali • English
- Time zone: UTC+6 (BST)
- Postal code: 5800
- Calling code: 051
- UN/LOCODE: BD BRG
- HDI (2023): 0.674 medium 14th of 22
- Website: www.bogra.gov.bd

Bogra (Bengali: বগুড়া), officially Bogura, is a city located in Bogra District, Rajshahi Division, Bangladesh. The city is a major commercial hub in Northern Bangladesh. It is the second largest city in terms of both area and population in Rajshahi Division.

Bogra is named after Nasiruddin Bughra Khan, the Governor of Bengal from 1279 to 1282 and a son of Delhi sultan Ghiyasuddin Balban. The city is approximately 71.56 km^{2} (27.63 sq mi) and is divided into 21 wards. Bogra has a population of around 480,000 people. Since it is one of the oldest cities in Bengal, Bogra is famous for its many ancient Buddhist stupas, Hindu temples, and ancient palaces of Buddhist kings and Muslim sultans.

The city was home to several notable individuals including Prime Minister Mohammad Ali Bogra of Pakistan, and President Ziaur Rahman of Bangladesh, both of whom were born and lived in the city.

In 2018, the name of the city was officially changed from "Bogra" to "Bogura" by the Bangladeshi government, in order to reflect their pronunciation in Bangla.

== History ==
Bogra occupies a distinguished place in the history of Bengal, with human settlement in the region dating back over two millennia. The area’s earliest documented civilization is found at Mahasthangarh, located just north of the present city. Identified as the ancient city of Pundranagara, it served as the capital of the Pundravardhana kingdom, a thriving centre of urban life, trade, and cultural exchange from at least the 3rd century BCE. Excavations at Mahasthangarh have unearthed fortified walls, inscriptions, urban layouts, and religious structures, attesting to the region’s prosperity and sustained importance through the Mauryan, Gupta, and Pala periods of South Asian history.

With the expansion of Muslim rule into Bengal in the medieval era, the settlement that would become modern Bogra gained strategic and administrative prominence. Local tradition and historical references attribute the city’s name — originally Bogra and now Bogura— to Sultan Nasir Uddin Bogra Khan, a 13th‑century ruler whose governance helped shape the region’s identity during a transformative age in Bengal’s political landscape.

The advent of British colonial rule introduced structured civic administration and urban planning to Bogura. In 1876, the town was formally constituted as a municipality, initiating an era of organized governance. Throughout the late 19th and early 20th centuries, Bogura expanded its economic and educational footprint, emerging as a key regional hub with vital transport links connecting Northern Bengal to wider trade networks.

Bogura’s people actively engaged in the Bangladesh Liberation War of 1971, participating in resistance efforts against the occupying forces. The district’s contributions to the struggle for independence are commemorated through memorials and narratives that honor the courage and sacrifice of its residents.In the decades following independence, Bogura has continued to evolve while preserving its rich historical legacy. Today the city stands as a vibrant centre of commerce, education, and culture in northern Bangladesh, where ancient archaeological heritage sits alongside modern institutions and bustling marketplaces.

== Climate ==
Bogra has a monsoon-influenced humid subtropical climate (Köppen Cwa) characterized by clear seasonal variation. The city experiences a hot and increasingly humid pre-monsoon period, followed by a pronounced monsoon season with frequent heavy rainfall, overcast skies, and high atmospheric moisture. During the monsoon months, persistent rain and occasional thunderstorms are common, often leading to water-saturated ground and elevated river levels in surrounding areas. In contrast, the winter season is comparatively dry and mild, with warm afternoons, cooler nights, clearer skies, and much lower humidity. Transitional periods between seasons are typically short, with temperatures rising quickly before the onset of the monsoon and gradually moderating after its withdrawal. Overall, Bogura’s climate reflects the broader North Bengal pattern of a dominant wet season and a distinctly drier, more comfortable winter period.

Climate data for Bogra (1991–2020 normals, extremes 1884–present)
Month	Jan	Feb	Mar	Apr	May	Jun	Jul	Aug	Sep	Oct	Nov	Dec	Year
Record high °C (°F)	31.1 (88.0)	34.8 (94.6)	40.6 (105.1)	44.0 (111.2)	41.5 (106.7)	40.6 (105.1)	37.9 (100.2)	37.7 (99.9)	38.4 (101.1)	37.4 (99.3)	34.5 (94.1)	32.0 (89.6)	44.0 (111.2)
Mean daily maximum °C (°F)	24.0 (75.2)	27.6 (81.7)	31.4 (88.5)	33.3 (91.9)	33.4 (92.1)	33.1 (91.6)	32.4 (90.3)	32.7 (90.9)	32.5 (90.5)	32.1 (89.8)	30.2 (86.4)	26.1 (79.0)	30.7 (87.3)
Daily mean °C (°F)	17.3 (63.1)	21.1 (70.0)	25.3 (77.5)	27.8 (82.0)	28.4 (83.1)	29.0 (84.2)	29.0 (84.2)	29.2 (84.6)	28.5 (83.3)	26.7 (80.1)	22.8 (73.0)	18.6 (65.5)	25.3 (77.5)
Mean daily minimum °C (°F)	11.6 (52.9)	14.7 (58.5)	19.3 (66.7)	22.8 (73.0)	24.2 (75.6)	26.0 (78.8)	26.4 (79.5)	26.6 (79.9)	25.9 (78.6)	23.6 (74.5)	18.5 (65.3)	13.9 (57.0)	21.1 (70.0)
Record low °C (°F)	4.5 (40.1)	6.7 (44.1)	10.6 (51.1)	16.7 (62.1)	17.3 (63.1)	19.4 (66.9)	21.1 (70.0)	21.7 (71.1)	21.1 (70.0)	17.2 (63.0)	11.0 (51.8)	4.9 (40.8)	4.5 (40.1)
Average precipitation mm (inches)	8 (0.3)	15 (0.6)	21 (0.8)	82 (3.2)	210 (8.3)	309 (12.2)	338 (13.3)	278 (10.9)	277 (10.9)	151 (5.9)	7 (0.3)	7 (0.3)	1,703 (67)
Average precipitation days (≥ 1 mm)	1	2	3	6	13	16	20	19	16	8	1	1	106
Average relative humidity (%)	71	64	62	71	76	82	83	82	83	78	73	73	75
Mean monthly sunshine hours	188.4	212.9	239.4	215.1	197.0	148.2	150.0	155.9	159.0	222.2	226.8	203.4	2,318.3
Source 1: NOAA
Source 2: Bangladesh Meteorological Department (humidity 1981-2010)

== Demographics ==
Population

Historical population
Year / Pop. / ±% p.a.; 2011 / 350,397 / —	Year / Pop. / ±% p.a.; 2022 / 422,969 / +1.73%

According to the 2022 Bangladesh census, Bogura city had 126,412 households and a population of 486,016. Bogura Metropolitan Area has a total population of 1,015,000.

Key Demographic Indicators of Bogura City (2022 Census)
Category	Percent
Muslim	94.10%
Hindu	5.79%
Other or not stated	1.0%
Male population	50.45%
Female population	49.55%
Under 10 years	15.34%
Literacy rate (7+)	65.70%

Bogura city has a predominantly Muslim population, with a small Hindu minority and very few residents identifying with other religions. The gender distribution is nearly balanced, with males slightly outnumbering females, reflecting a typical urban pattern in Bangladesh. A significant portion of the population is young, with around 15% under the age of ten, highlighting ongoing population growth and the city’s role as an emerging urban centre. The literacy rate among residents aged seven and above is moderately high, indicating growing educational attainment, though there is still scope for improvement to reach national targets. Together, these demographic characteristics reveal a city that is young, diverse, and steadily developing, with social and educational dynamics that will influence its economic growth and urban planning in the years ahead.

== Economy ==
Workforce distribution in Bogura (2023)
Sector	Percent
Agriculture	35.09%
Commerce	20.32%
Service sector	16.15%
Transport and communication	8.47%
Construction	2.87%
Non-agricultural labor	2.79%
Industry	2.67%
Religious services	0.18%
Rent and remittance	0.69%
Other industries	10.77%

Bogura’s economy retains a strong agricultural foundation, with the fertile alluvial plains of the district supporting a range of crops that drive both local livelihoods and regional food production. Agriculture remains a key pillar of the local economy, and ongoing efforts to modernize farming practices are seen through initiatives that boost productivity and sustainability.

Beyond traditional agriculture, Bogura has emerged as a major centre for light engineering and machinery production. The district’s workshops and industrial clusters manufacture agricultural and industrial machinery — including irrigation pumps, engine parts, threshers, and filters — supplying a large share of domestic demand and reducing reliance on imports. Local entrepreneurs have expanded these industries from small backyard workshops into dynamic commercial enterprises that employ thousands and contribute significantly to the regional economy. This light engineering sector is widely recognized as a driver of economic activity in Bogura, with hundreds of small and medium factories collectively producing equipment that supports both farming and manufacturing sectors across Bangladesh. The industry’s growth has positioned Bogura as a key industrial hub in the northern region, often attracting skilled technicians and fostering entrepreneurship.

Bogura’s commercial activity also includes emerging business sectors such as automobile sales and repair, which have developed along major transport corridors and created new employment opportunities locally. These commercial hubs reflect the city’s evolving role as a regional marketplace and service centre.Bogura’s local economy benefits from collaborative development programmes. For example, partnerships between organisations like Thengamara Mohila Sabuj Sangha (TMSS) and financial institutions such as Standard Chartered Bangladesh support rural livelihoods by providing agricultural inputs, training, and technical support to farmers — helping to improve productivity and income generation in surrounding communities. The district has also seen growth in value‑added agricultural products, including dairy goods such as its famed yogurt, which has gained a Geographical Indication (GI) tag and expanded market demand nationally. These developments diversify Bogura’s economic base and create new opportunities beyond farming and machinery.

== Tourism ==
Bogura is a city rich in historical, archaeological, and cultural attractions, making it a major destination for visitors interested in heritage, local traditions, and natural scenery.

=== Major historical and archaeological sites ===
- Mahasthangarh– The earliest known urban archaeological site in Bangladesh, located near Mahasthan village in Shibganj Upazila. It contains the remains of Pundranagara (Paundravardhanapura), an ancient city of the Pundravardhana kingdom, and is sacred to Buddhists, Muslims, and Hindus.
- Behular Bashor Ghor – A culturally significant site in Bogura associated with the famous Bengali folk tale of Behula and Lakhindar. According to legend, Behula’s devotion and courage brought her husband, Lakhindar, back to life after he died due to a curse from the serpent goddess Manasa. The site is a popular tourist attraction, symbolizing love, loyalty, and local folklore.
- Nawab Palace (Neelkuthi) – A historic palace in Bogura that once served as the residence of the local Nawabs. During the British colonial period, it was referred to as Neelkuthi. The palace complex now houses a museum and preserves a collection of artifacts, furniture, and architectural elements from the Nawab era. The site offers visitors insight into the royal heritage, lifestyle, and governance of Bogura's aristocratic past, making it an important cultural and historical attraction.
- Kherua Mosque – An important historical mosque in Bogura, noted for its medieval Islamic architecture and intricate design. The mosque features traditional brickwork, decorative arches, and domes that reflect the architectural style of the region during the Sultanate period. It remains an active place of worship and a popular site for visitors interested in religious heritage and historic architecture.
- Mazar of Shah Sultan Balkhi – A historic shrine in Bogura dedicated to Shah Sultan Balkhi, a revered Sufi saint known for spreading Islam in northern Bengal. The site is visited by devotees and tourists alike, reflecting the region’s spiritual heritage and Sufi traditions. The shrine hosts annual religious gatherings and urs celebrations, offering insight into local devotional practices and community life.
- Mazar of Panchpir – A historic shrine in Bogura dedicated to five revered Sufi saints (hence the name "Panchpir", meaning "five saints"). The site is an important center of local spiritual life, attracting pilgrims and visitors who come to pay respects, especially during annual religious observances. It reflects the region’s Sufi heritage and cultural traditions.
- Poroshuram's Palace – A historic palace in Bogura associated with the legendary warrior Poroshuram, said to have built the palace as his royal residence. Local folklore links the site to tales of bravery, justice, and royal intrigue, making it a cultural landmark that draws visitors interested in history and myth.
- Gobind Bhita – A historic site in Bogura tied to local legends of devotion and heroism. Folklore says it was once a center where the people of the region gathered for spiritual practices and community rituals. Visitors are drawn to Gobind Bhita not only for its archaeological importance but also for the mystique of the legends associated with the site, making it a unique blend of history and culture.
- Gokul Medh– A terraced mound believed to be a former Buddhist shrine, connected to local folklore and early spiritual practice.
- Vasu Bihar – Another Buddhist archaeological site showcasing spiritual and cultural traditions.
- Mahasthan Archaeological Museum – Displays pottery, sculptures, and artifacts from the site.
- Khudai Pathar Bhita – Historic carved stone site reflecting medieval craftsmanship and heritage.
- Bihar Dhap – Ancient Buddhist remains illustrating the religious history of the region.
- Yogir Bhaban – An ancient hermitage associated with meditation and spiritual practices.

== Notable Person ==
- Ziaur Rahman, former President of Bangladesh, army officer, Chief Martial Law Administrator
- Humayun Ahmed, writer and filmmaker
- Khademul Bashar, Bir Uttam, chief of the Bangladesh Air Force in 1976
- Apu Biswas, film actress
- Muhammad Ali Bogra, Prime Minister of Pakistan (1953–1955)
- Akhteruzzaman Elias, novelist and short story writer
- Gaziul Haque, Bengali language movement activist
- Loqman Husain, first Secretary of the Ministry of Posts, Telegraphs and Telephones of Bangladesh and inaugural Executive Director of the Asia-Pacific Telecommunity
- Muhammed Zafar Iqbal, physicist
- R I M Aminur Rashid, 6th Vice-Chancellor of Bangladesh Open University
- Hochemin Islam, transgender activist
- Shafiul Islam, cricketer
- Tarun Majumdar, Indian film director
- Mushfiqur Rahim, cricketer
- Towhid Hridoy, cricketer
- Tanzid Hasan, cricketer
- Amalesh Sen, footballer
- Shahinur Kabir Shimul, footballer
- Pinaki Bhattacharya, Human rights activist, anti-fascist
- Nabib Newaj Jibon, footballer

== See also ==
- Bogra Sadar Upazila
- Bogra District
- Bogra Cantonment
- Upazilas of Bangladesh
- Districts of Bangladesh
- Divisions of Bangladesh
- Upazila
- Thana
- Administrative geography of Bangladesh
