= Barli Inscription =

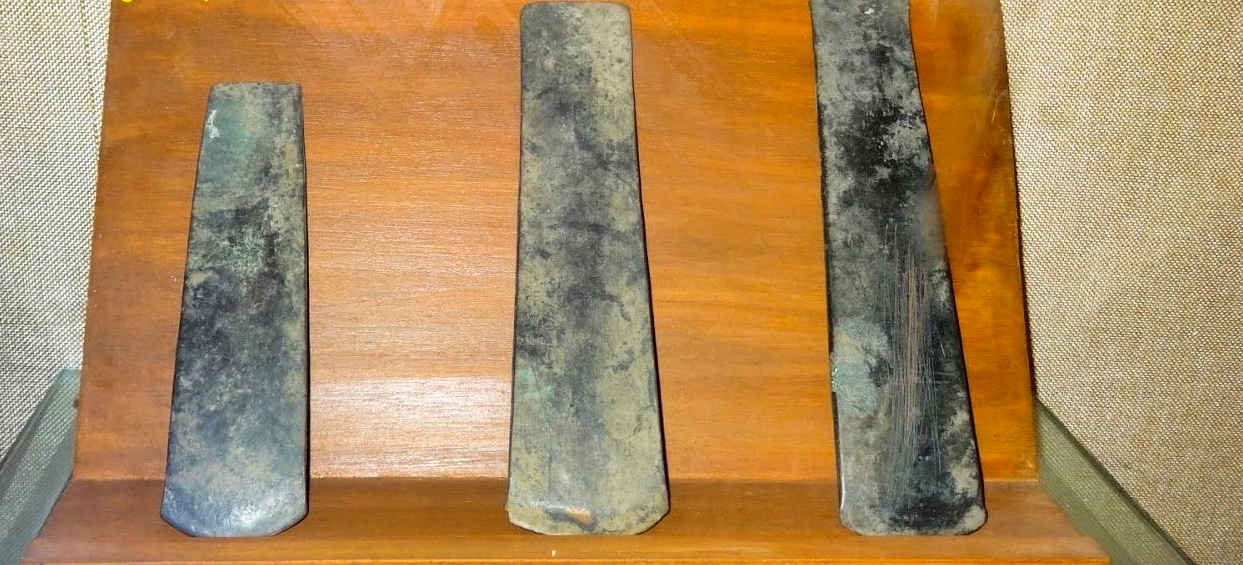
- Barli Inscription excavated in Rajasthan
- Material: Stone
- Size: 13x10 inches
- Writing: Prakrit language, Brahmi script
- Period/culture: 443 BCE or 2nd-1st century BCE
- Discovered: 26°18′48.3″N 72°55′51.6″E
- Discovered by: G. H. Ojha
- Place: Ajmer district, Rajasthan
- Present location: Rājputānā Government Museum, Ajmer

The Barli Inscription (obtained from a Bhinaika village 36 miles southeast of Ajmer) is one of the earliest Jaina inscriptions reported from Rajasthan, India. It was discovered by historian G. H. Ojha in 1912 and originally dated as belonging to c. 443 B.C, which some scholars have repeated recently, though some other scholars of ancient Indian epigraphy have argued on palaeographic grounds that it is dateable to 2nd or 1st century BCE, though it is fragmentary and aspects of its interpretation have been disputed.

== History ==
According to historian G. H. Ojha, who discovered the inscription from bhillot mata temple in 1912, the inscription contains the line Viraya Bhagavate chaturasiti vase, which can be interpreted as "dedicated to Lord Vira in his 84th year". Based on this reading, Ojha concluded that the record was inscribed in 443 BCE means 84 Years after the Nirvana of Tirthankara Mahavira. "Vira" is one of the epithets of 24th Tirthankara Mahavira. K. P. Jayaswal also agreed with Ojha's reading. Indian Magazine Editor Ramananda Chatterjee has assigned the inscription to the 4th century BCE. Archaeological Survey of India, the principal archaeological survey body of India, published that the inscription is of a pre-Ashokan period. Later, in 1966, Rajasthan's Ajmer District Gazetteer's Office published similar deductions. Some oriental research institutes also published similar views. This inscription also indicates that the Jainism become the most prominent religion of Rajasthan since ancient time. Also the inscriptions in kankali tila mathura mentions madhyamika (ancient Rajasthan) was a prominent Jain centre around 2nd to 1st century BCE. Also the Jain tradition mentions the upseka gaccha monk Swayambrabhasuri and Ratnabrabhasuri responsible for spread of Jainism in Rajasthan from 6th to 5th century BCE.

Originally scholars assigned this inscription to a pre-Ashokan period, but some recent scholars have assigned it to a later date. Richard Salomon—who argues for a late 2nd century BCE dating—claims the proposed pre-Ashokan dating is "decisively discredited" and Ojha's interpretation is "out of the question". "On palaeographic grounds [the Barli inscription] has to be placed after the Besnagar inscription of Heliodorus and is possibly later than the Ghosundi inscription".

Historians such as D. C. Sircar and S. R. Goyal have disputed the theory that the inscription is dated in the Vira Nirvana Samvat, arguing that this era was first used in the early medieval period, and most probably did not exist in the century following the death of Mahavira. According to these scholars, the inscription can be assigned to the late 2nd or 1st century BCE on paleographic grounds. Sircar dismisses Ojha's reading of the inscription as inaccurate, and states that word "Bhagavata" in the inscription refers to the 2nd-1st century BCE Shunga king Bhagavata. However, this is also disputed by some historians who advocate the view that "such inference can hardly be adduced for this inscription". Some recent scholars have also claimed that the Brahmi script of the inscription matches with other supposed pre-Ashokan inscriptions of Piprahawa and of Tamil Nadu and Sri Lanka.

Ahmad Hasan Dani, while critiquing aspects of Sircar's interpretation, agreed that the inscription must be dated 2nd or 1st century BCE. Thakur Prasad Verma, a professor of Indology at Banaras Hindu University, critiqued Sircar's translation and supported Dani's view that Sircar's proposed reading of the first letter of the fragmentary inscription was based on epigraphical features which are not observed in the period Sircar thinks it belongs to. Dani holds that a "definite reading was not possible owing to its fragmentary nature". However, Verma overall agrees with Sircar's view that the inscription can be placed in the first century BC on palaeographic grounds, and maintains that "there is no reason to place this inscription in the fourth-fifth century B.C."Nevertheless, Verma considers both the readings unreliable and only agrees with the paleographic aspect of Sircar's findings.

Several more recent scholars and historians such as Dr. Rima Hooja repeat the view that the inscription may belong to the 5th-4th century BCE. Ram Pande published his work on the sources that delineate the cultural history of Rajasthan in 1983, wherein he reinforced G. H. Ojha's findings. Several other works including those tracing the history of Jainism in Mewar published similar views.

== Description ==
This inscription is present on a piece of the pillar of dimension 13x10 inches. The inscription is written in Prakrit language. The writing was done by engraving, sewing, engraving, weaving, digging, piercing, burning, and punching. There are many defects in this inscription.

== See also ==
- Early Indian epigraphy
- Brahmi script
- Pale Jain cave
