= Utpatti pidugu =

Telugu name found in many inscriptions from ancient India

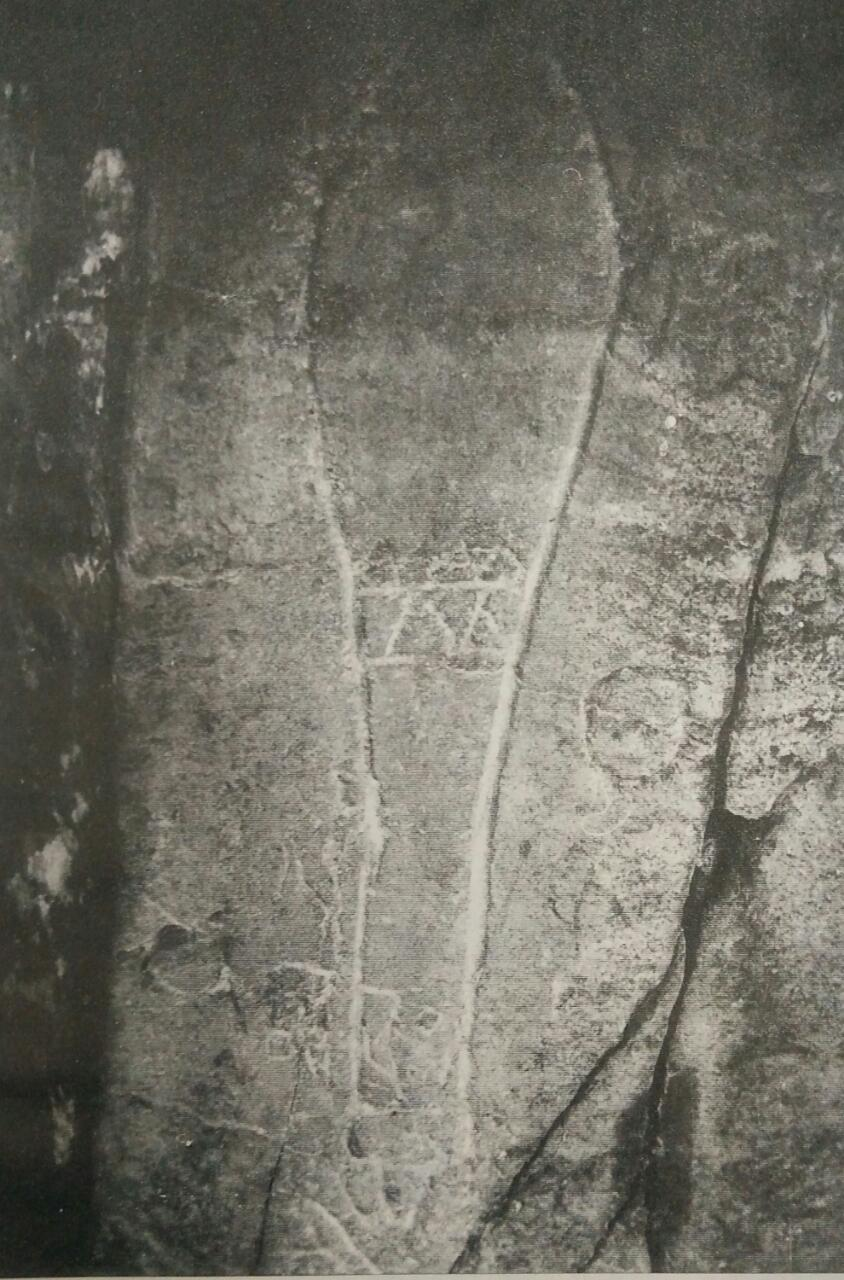
Insignia of Sri Utpatti pidugu, Upper cave Akkanna-Madanna cave complex, Vijayawada, Andhra Pradesh, credit - Sri Utpattipidugu, A special volume of Nirukta, Department of Art History and Aesthetics, Baroda, 2005.

The term 'Utpatti pidugu' is arguably a name that appears on many inscriptions from ancient India. Many historians have taken note of these inscriptions and have written extensively on them. The meaning of these words is 'thunder bolt' and it is believed that it may be the name of an artist guild working in Andhra Pradesh. The inscription is written is Telugu-Kannada script.

K.V. Soundararajan has read the inscription as Utpatipidugu and interprets it as a pilgrim label. Deepak Kannal and Jayaram Poduval have worked on a special volume titled 'Sri Utpattipidugu', Nirukta, 2005. Deepak Kannal believes that Utpatti pidugu could be the name of a religious leader who created a new movement and was able to gain political influence.

== List of sites on which this title occurs ==
List of sites:

=== Cave temples ===
- Akkanna Madanna
- Mogalrajapuram
- Undavalli
- Ghatnandra
- Bhokardan

=== Structural temples ===
- Alampur
- Satyavolu
- Mahanandisvara temple at Mahanandi - The inscription here reads thus, "vanjjita i (U)tpattipidugu koluvu kkamiya Pritivi Bhi(ma) vrase, which has been deciphered by Deepak Kannal with the help of Krishna Shastri as "Vanchhita Sri Utpattipidugu koluvu Kamiya Ptrivibhima. Vrase...". i.e. created as per the desire of Sri Utpattipidugu. Written in the service of Kamiya Prthvibhima. This has been mentioned in the volume titled 'Sri Utpattipidugu', Nirukta, Journal of Art History and Aesthetics, Baroda, MS University, 2005.

B.Rajendra Prasad further adds that in a sandstone quarry located at Satanikota, Andhra Pradesh inscriptions have been found on boulders thus - "Sri Utpatti Pidugu, Sri Attumnan, Ekantanivasi loka sila bhima..." Many carved stones and pillars were also recovered from this site.

== See also ==
- Early Telugu epigraphy
