= Deepak Kannal =

Indian art historian and sculptor

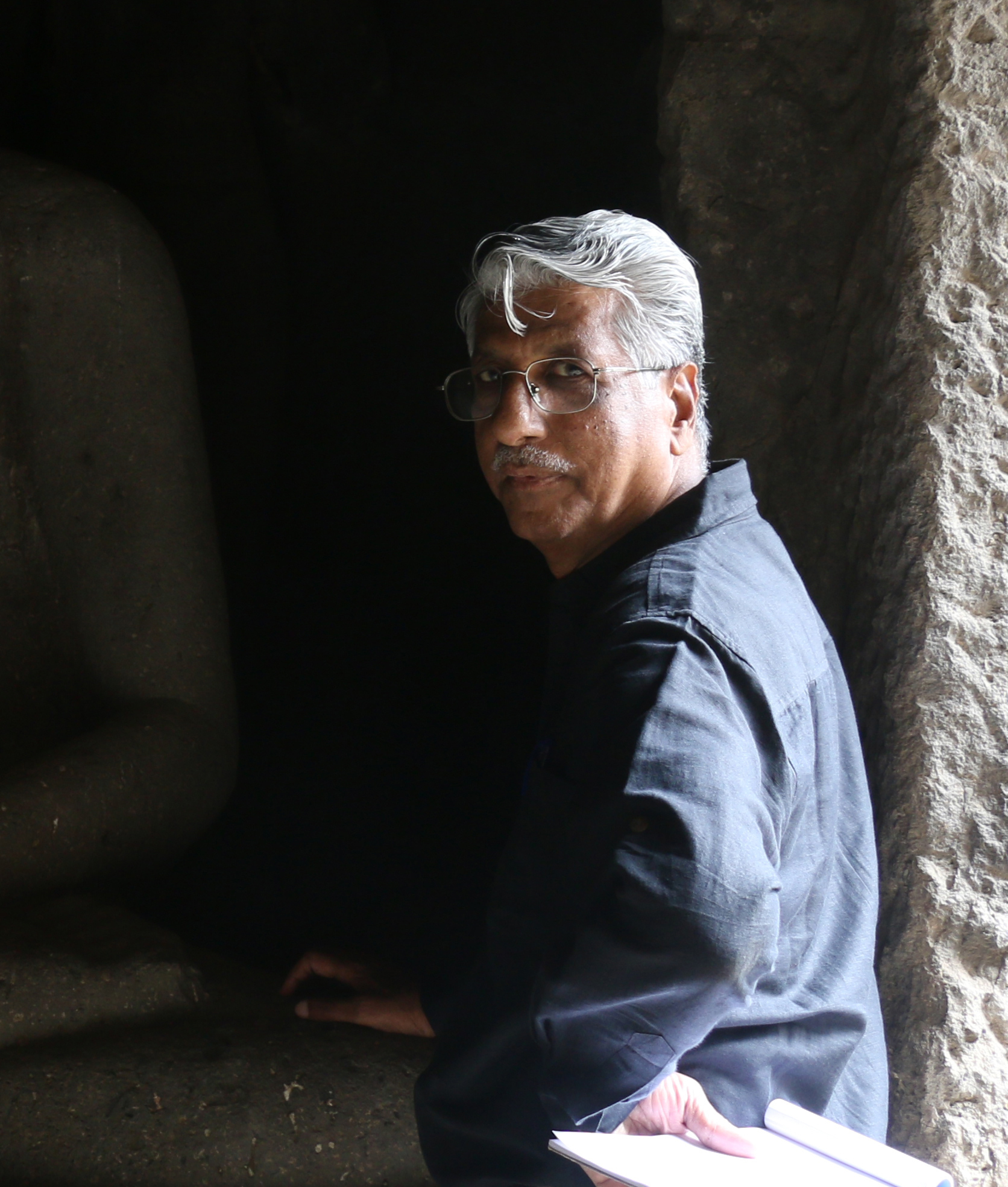
Professor Deepak Kannal at Ellora caves

Deepak Kannal (born 1949) is an Indian art historian, sculptor and a former professor at the Department of Art History and Aesthetics, Faculty of Fine Arts, Maharaja Sayajirao University of Baroda, Gujarat where he also served as dean and head of the department. He is a specialist on the Ellora caves on which he has written several influential research papers, delivered numerous lectures and has authored a book titled Ellora-An Enigma in Sculptural Styles (1996).

== Life and work ==
Kannal studied sculpture at Faculty of Fine Arts, Baroda (1975) and established himself as a sculptor early in his career. After this he pursued Art History in which he received his second post-graduate degree (1983). He completed his doctoral thesis in 1993 in which he worked on the sculpture of Ellora caves.

Kannal worked as the Head of the department, UGC/DSA coordinator and the Dean of the Faculty. He has several notable publications that includes a book "Ellora-An Enigma in Sculptural Styles’’, a monograph, four co-edited volumes - one of them on Ellora Sculpture and Architecture, three edited journals, these are to be re-released soon as a single book, three full length plays, three dance dramas and more than seventy papers and articles on Art and Aesthetics to his credit. His dance drama named ‘Dipta Kailasa’ narrating the history of Kailasanatha monolith of Ellora and the myths associated with it was performed at Ellora, in the vicinity of the caves.

His most significant contribution in Art History is his teaching methodology and interpretation of Indian sculpture and Indian Aesthetics. He is an authority on Ellora cave sculpture. and has dedicated his entire life in studying the subject. His book on Ellora was reprinted in 2018 by Aprant Publishers, Pune.

Jaya Jose (1996) notes his work on Khajuraho sculpture and says, "Deepak Kannal whilst referring to the difficulties faced by scholars, with regard to the exact identification of some novel and complex images, at Khajuraho (in the absence of a comparative textual source to explain or identify these images), delves into the intricacies of the relation between the text, the image and more significantly the role of the artist in the entire icon-making process." His study of Khajuraho sculptures throws fresh light on the way in which historical textual sources and sculptural evidences must be examined. His focus remains the sculptors and their creative contribution while remaining within the limitations of their age and time.

One of his most significant contribution is his interpretation of the ignored inscription "Utpattipidugu". He has written about it in one of the volumes of the journal Nirukta which was also edited by him and has delivered several lectures on the subject.

He has created the syllabus for two subjects for UGC e-pathshala Post Graduate course in Fine Arts and Aesthetics - Indian Sculpture and Indian Aesthetics

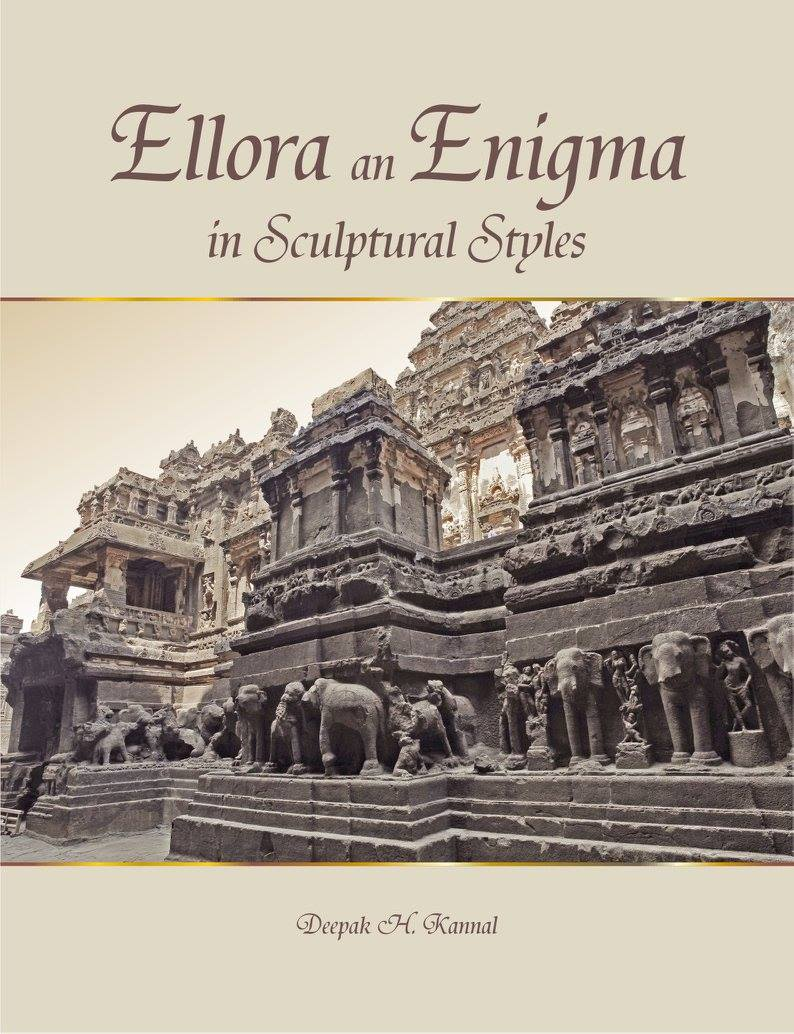
Ellora - An Enigma in Sculptural Styles by Deepak Kannal

=== Ellora - an Enigma in Sculptural Styles ===
Deepak Kannal worked on the Brahmanical sculptures of Ellora for his PhD, which was published as the book titled "Ellora - an Enigma in Sculptural Styles" in 1996. In the book he uses formalism as a tool to study the images and also devises his own unique methods of tracing sculptural guilds throughout the Indian subcontinent. In this work he traces several sculptor guilds which travelled to Ellora and worked there, while also examining patterns of classicism and romanticism at the site. In the chapter 'Introduction to Theatricality', he traces the quality of performance in sculpture which also becomes flamboyant in few images. The methods he devises in this work come from his own experience as a practicing sculptor and his familiarity in working with the medium of stone and metal.

In his recent lectures (2020) he has developed his work on Ellora sculptors and architects further using the same methodological tools.

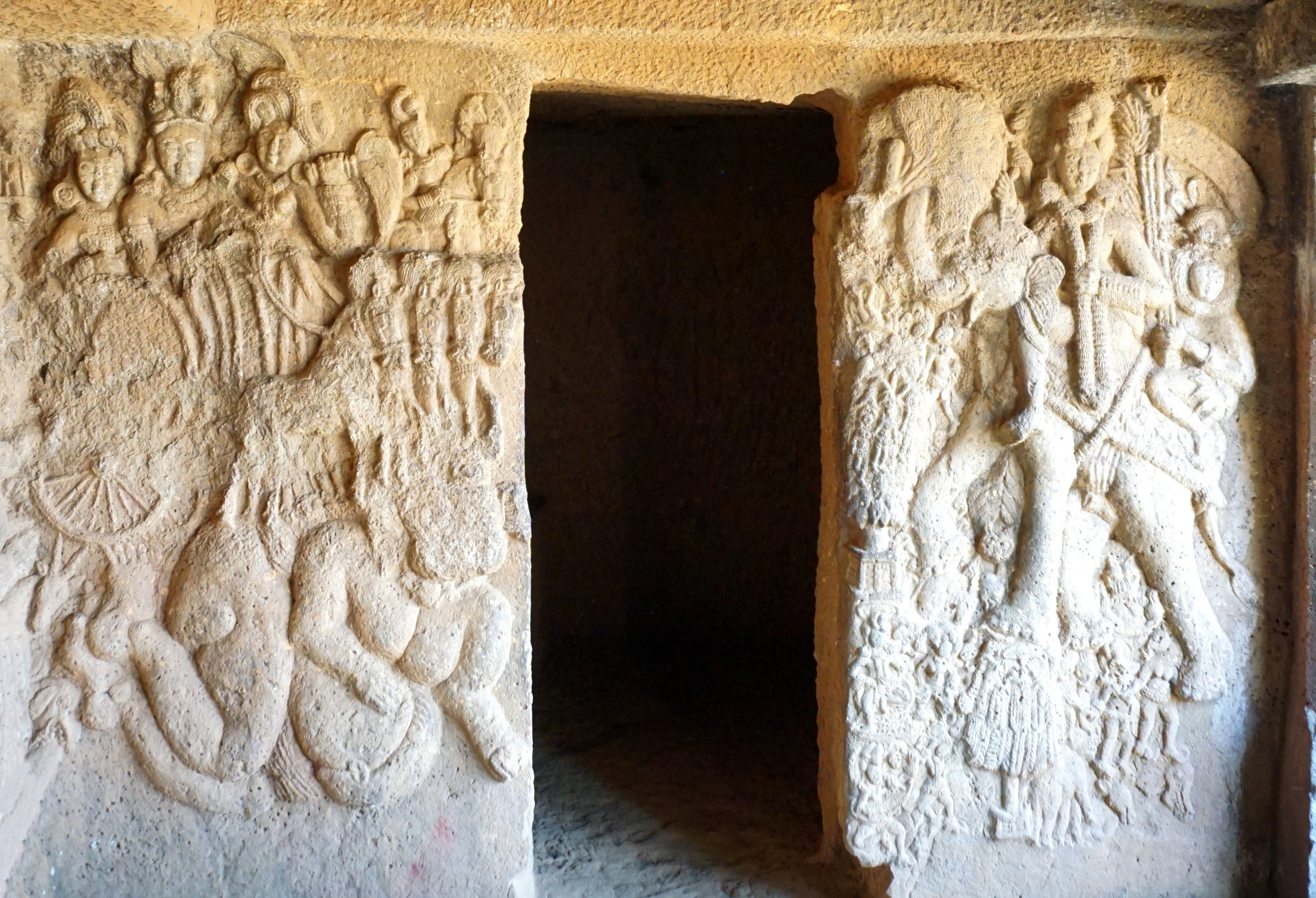
Kharavela and Sri Satakarni, Bhaja cave sculpture, different interpretation proposed by professor Kannal.

=== History as Allegory: The Bhaja Narratives ===
In his research paper titled "History as Allegory: The Bhaja Narratives", published in the volume 'Towards a New Art History: Studies in Indian Art', 2003, Deepak Kannal has proposed a fresh identification of the famous sculpture of Bhaja caves, generally identified as Surya and Indra. He proposes that the depiction is a political allegory and it shows the conflict between Ceta Kharavela of eastern India and Simuka Satavahana of Deccan. In his own words -

"I propose that the inadequately though not erroneously identified sculptural panel from Bhaja is a visual record of Sri Satakarni's conquest over Kharavela"

He interprets the many other figures in this sculpture allegorically, for instance, the 'mouse headed woman', he says, is the personification of the city which is being routed by Kharavela on the other site, the Bodhi tree and the rejoicing around it shows Satakarni's victory.

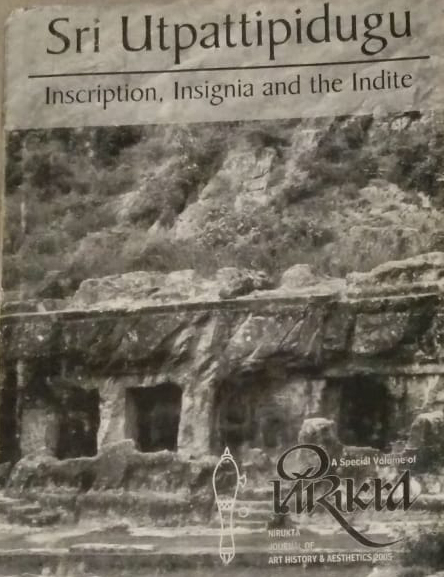
Sri Utpattipidugu - Inscription, Insignia and the Indite, A special volume of Nirukta, Journal of Art History & Aesthetics, 2005.

=== Sri Utpattipidugu: Inscription, Insignia and the Indite ===
Sri Utpattipidugu is a special volume of Nirukta journal, which was published by Art History and Aesthetics department, Faculty of Fine Arts, Maharaja Sayajirao University of Baroda, Vadodara in 2005. It is a detailed study of the inscription 'Utpatti pidugu' which has been traced at several archaeological sites, sometimes with an insignia and sometimes without it. Deepak Kannal, in this volume has suggested the possibility that Utpatti pidugu could be the name of a religious leader who created a new movement within Brahmanism and was able to gain political influence.

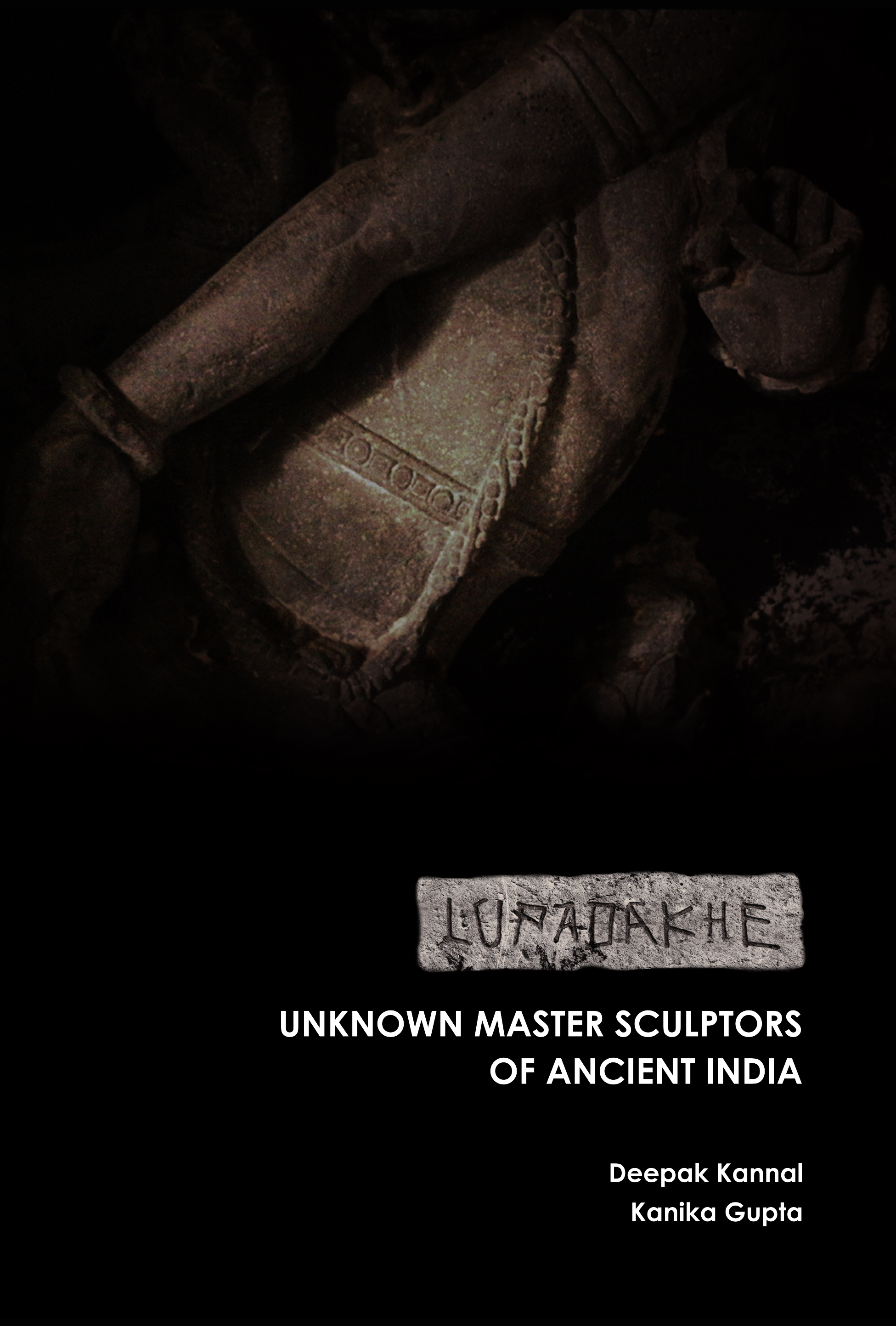
Lupadakhe - Unknown Master Sculptors of Ancient India by Deepak Kannal and Kanika Gupta.

=== Lupadakhe - Unknown Master Sculptors of Ancient India ===
The book commemorates the legacy of the forgotten and therefore unknown sculptors of ancient India. Co-authored along with Kanika Gupta, this work takes the methodology adopted by Deepak Kannal in his previous work on Ellora forward and identifies a few Master Sculptors from ancient India. It discusses some of the best of sculptures from the Indian tradition and talks about Indian sculptural aesthetics using the ancient Indian lexicon along with citing instances from the European tradition.

"The book stands as proof to the fact that to a trained eye the sculpture speaks differently. It transforms into a visual map of craftsmanship, stylistic overture and is a marker of lineage. Every nuance has its place and every deliberation by the sculptor is embedded as their singular vision within the rock. Offering a loving permanence, Lupadakhe is a tribute to beauty and the heritage of the subcontinent’s unsung artistic genius."

This work was translated into Marathi by Vibha Oke and published in 2021.

He has been speaking extensively on Indian Aesthetics, Sculptural language and Linguistic theories for many years.

Drgambhrni: The Syntax and Semiotics of Sculpture and Indian Linguistic Theories. Agam Kala Prakashan, Delhi, 2023.

=== Drgambhrni: The Syntax and Semiotics of Sculpture and Indian Linguistic Theories ===
This book is the culmination of Deepak Kannal's research under the Tagore Fellowship. The subject has interested him for a very long time and he continues to work on linguistic theories. For the first time in the history of Indian aesthetics and Indian sculpture, this book attempts to make a link between Indian linguistic theories and the formulation of Indian sculptural language. Deepak Kannal introduces several new terms within this context, elaborating their definitions. He derives his words from ancient Indian terminology and beautifully contributes towards the tradition of Indian artistic theorisation.

== Plays ==
He wrote a play titled 'Jogidas Khuman', which was performed by Fine Art Natak Kampani, Tathagat, Faculty of Fine Arts, Baroda. The play is based on the writings of Gujarati writer Jhaverchand Meghani and the reports of Captain Bell of East India Company.

He wrote and directed a dance-drama titled 'Dipta Kailasa', which was performed in the vicinity of Ellora caves.

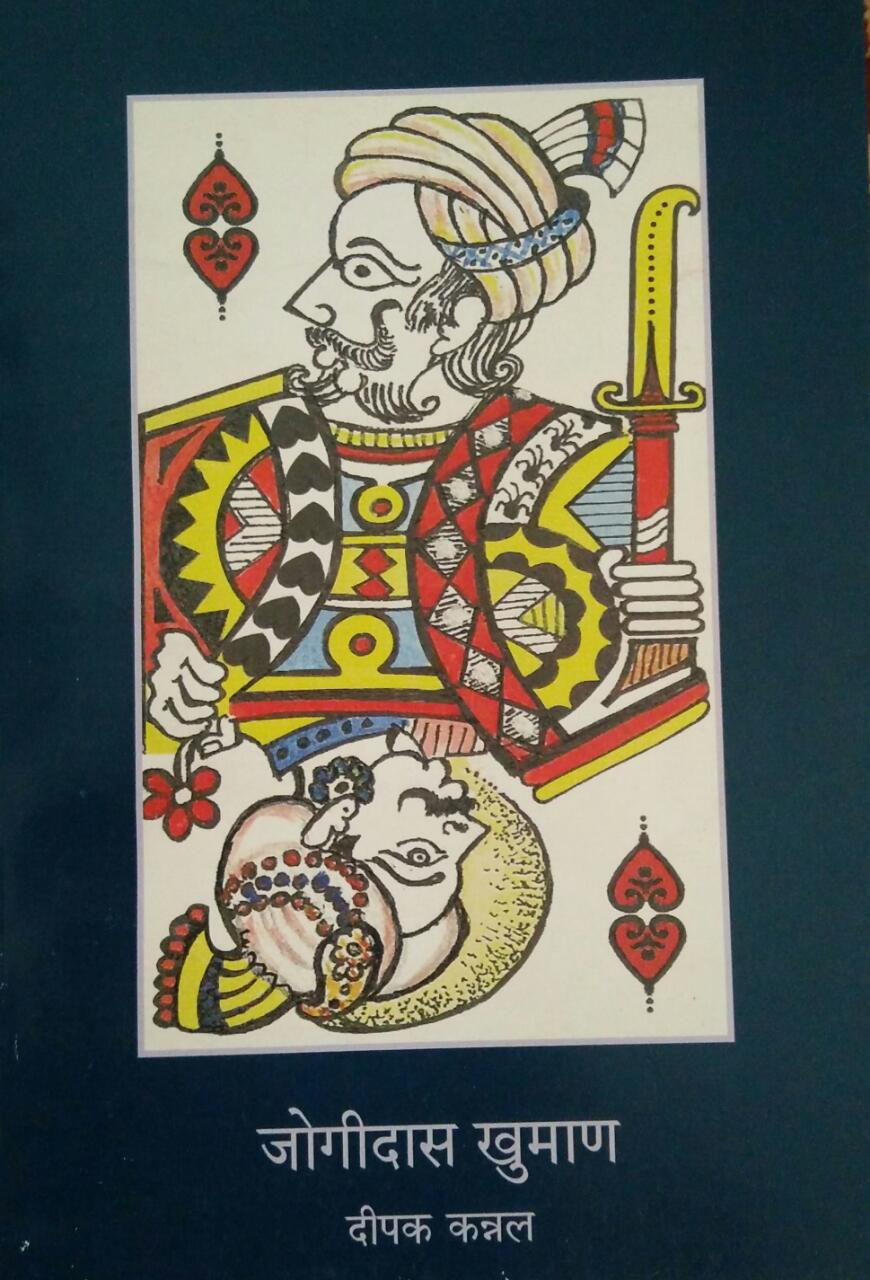
The play is based on the writings of Gujarati writer Jhaverchand Meghani and the reports of Captain Bell of East India Company.

He has been actively involved in theatre set design, acting and writing plays.

== Awards and recognition ==
He has organized and participated in many National/Inter National seminars, has delivered series of lectures for coveted institutes in India, US and UK and was invited on prestigious chairs instituted by various Academies, Museums and Universities. He is a recipient of a number of awards, scholarships and distinctions in Sculpture, Theatre and Art History including the Charles Wallace fellowship for his post doctoral project at Cambridge (1992), UK, National Lalit kala honorable mention, A.P. Council National award, The Gujarat Gaurav Puraskar, Raja Ravi Verma Samman and the Tagore National Fellowship in 2018 under which, he is working on the correspondence between Indian Linguistic Theories and Indian sculpture.

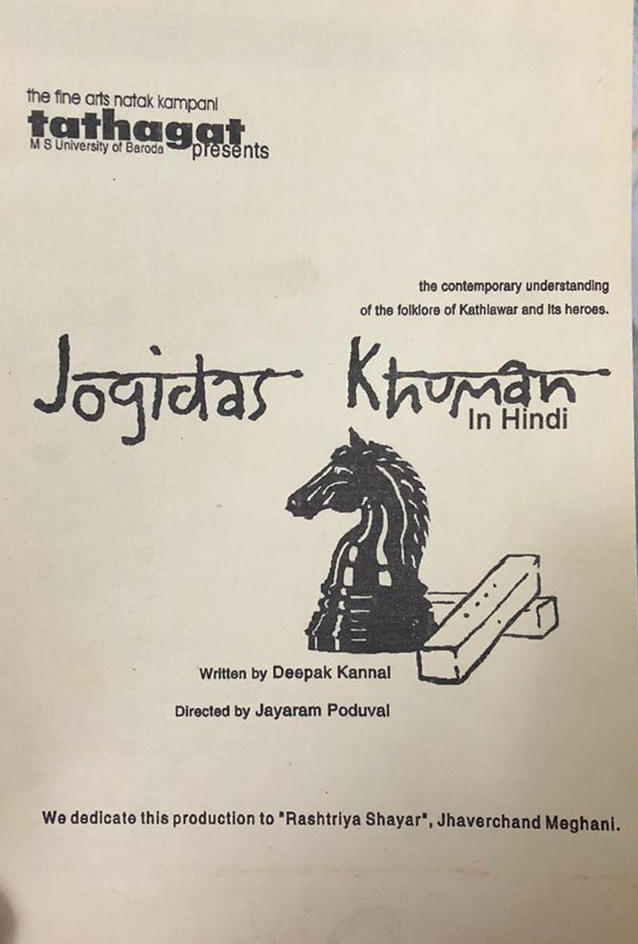
Jogidas Khuman, written by Deepak Kannal, performed by Fine Art Natak Kampani, Baroda.

== Bibliography ==
- Ellora, an Enigma in Sculptural Styles. Books & Books. ISBN 9788185016474 .(1996).
- Ellora Caves, sculptures and architecture: collected papers of the University Grants Commission's National Seminar, Ratan Parimoo, Deepak Kannal, Shivaji Panikkar (editors) India. University Grants Commission, Books & Books, Delhi, (1988).
- Nirukta, 3 Volumes, (edited Journal), Faculty of Fine Arts, Maharaja Sayajirao University of Baroda, Gujarat, (2004, 2005, 2006).
- Lupadakhe - Unknown Master Sculptors of Ancient India (Co-authored with Kanika Gupta), Mandala Books, Delhi, (2019)
- Lupadakhe - Unknown Master Sculptors of Ancient India (Co-authored with Kanika Gupta), translated in Marathi by Vibha Oke, Aprant Publishers, Pune (2021)
- Drgambhrni: The Syntax and Semiotics of Sculpture and Indian Linguistic Theories, Agam Kala Prakashan, Delhi (2023)
