= Early Indian epigraphy =

History of South Asian writing systems

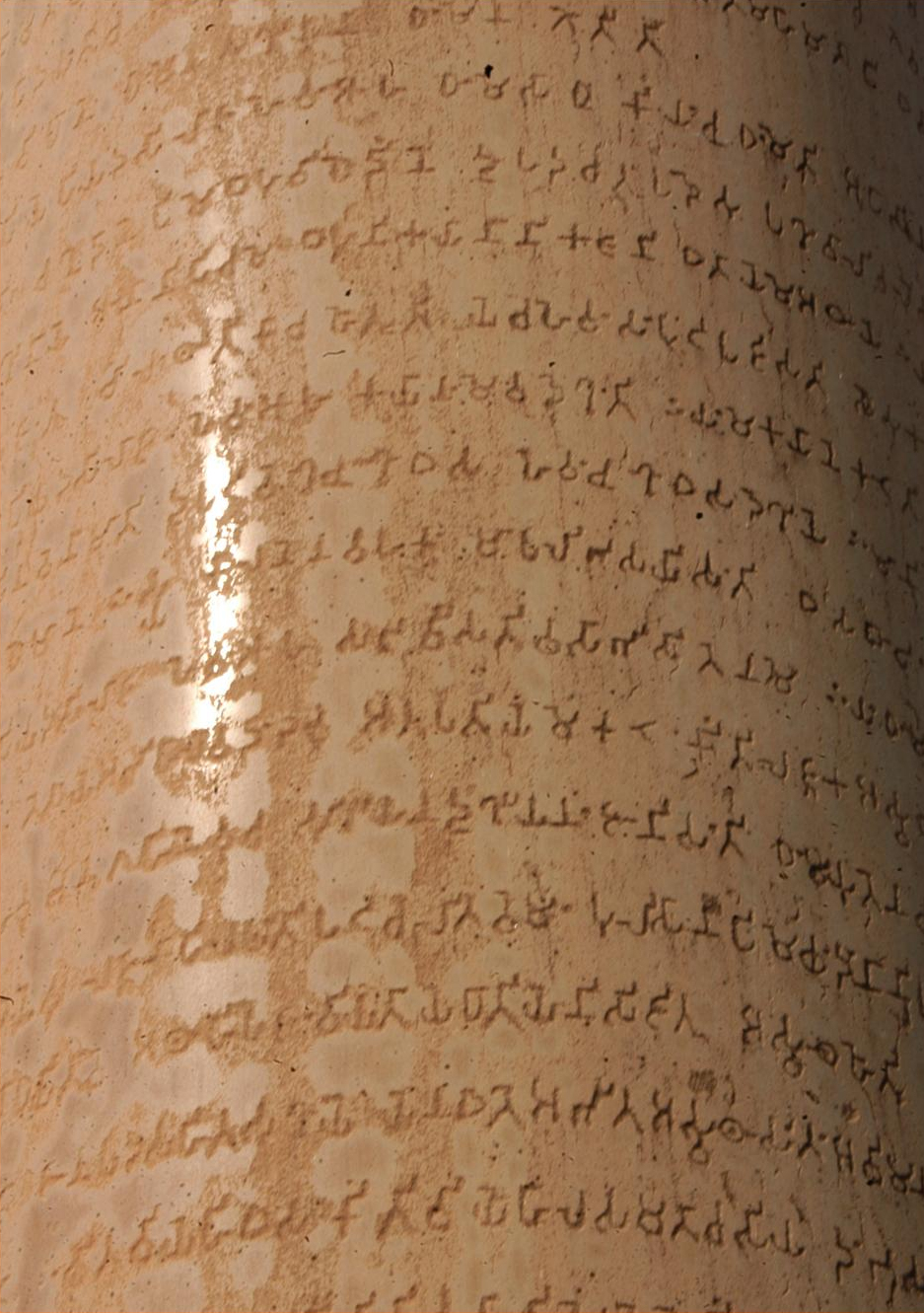
One of the Edicts of Ashoka in the Brahmi script, in Lauriya Araraj, Bihar, 3rd Century BC.

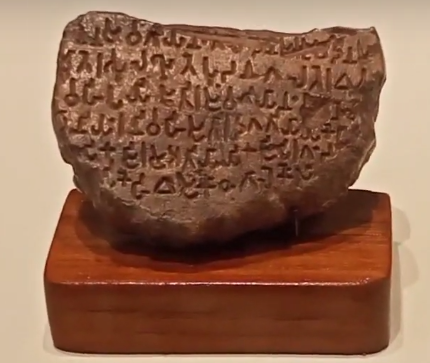
The Mahasthan Brahmi Inscription from Bengal, 3rd century BCE

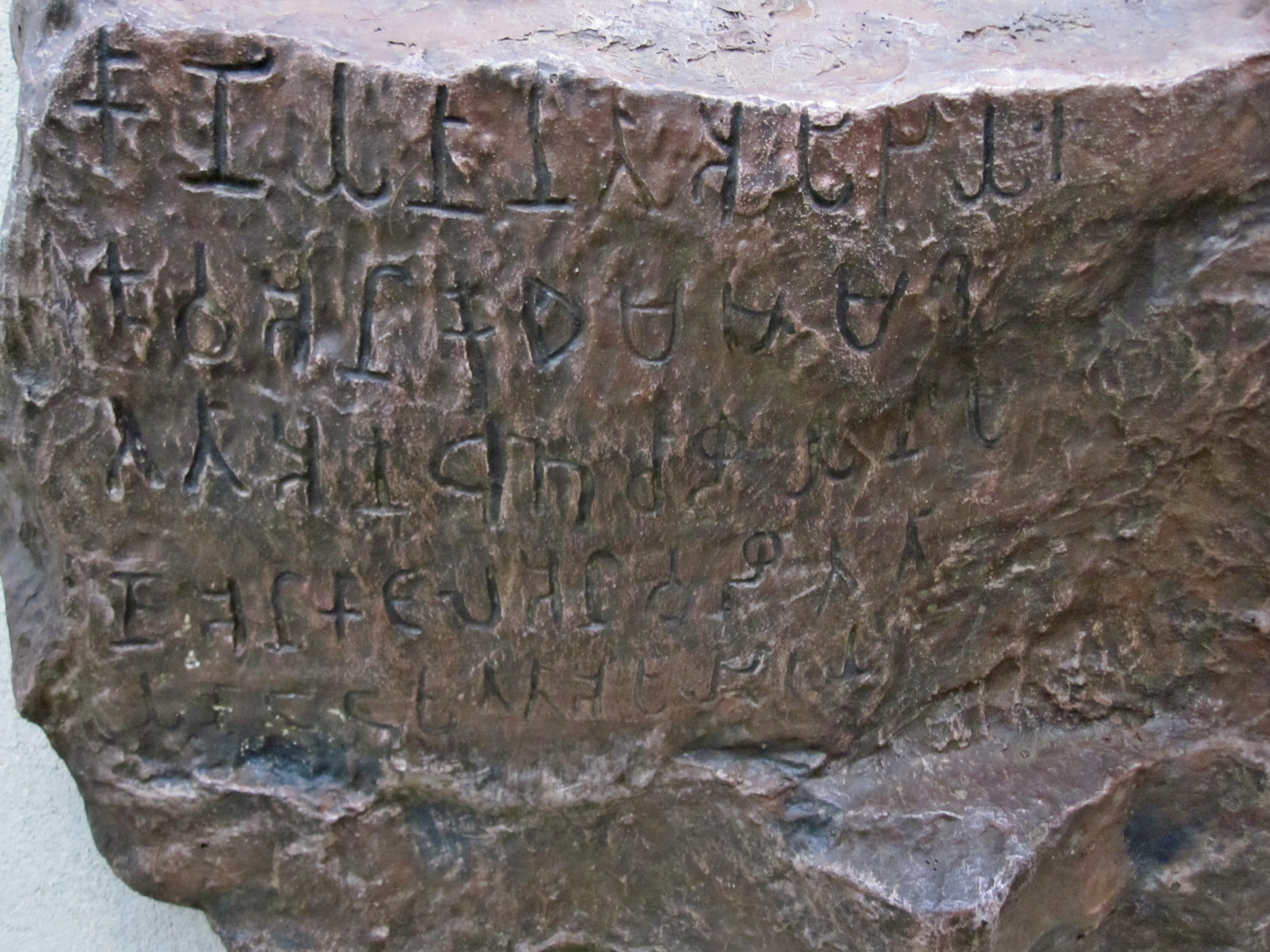
Tamil inscription from Mangulam, dated to 3rd century BCE by Iravatham Mahadevan

1st Century BCE. Silver Ring From Karur, Tamil Nadu with Personal Name "Peravatan" in Tamil script

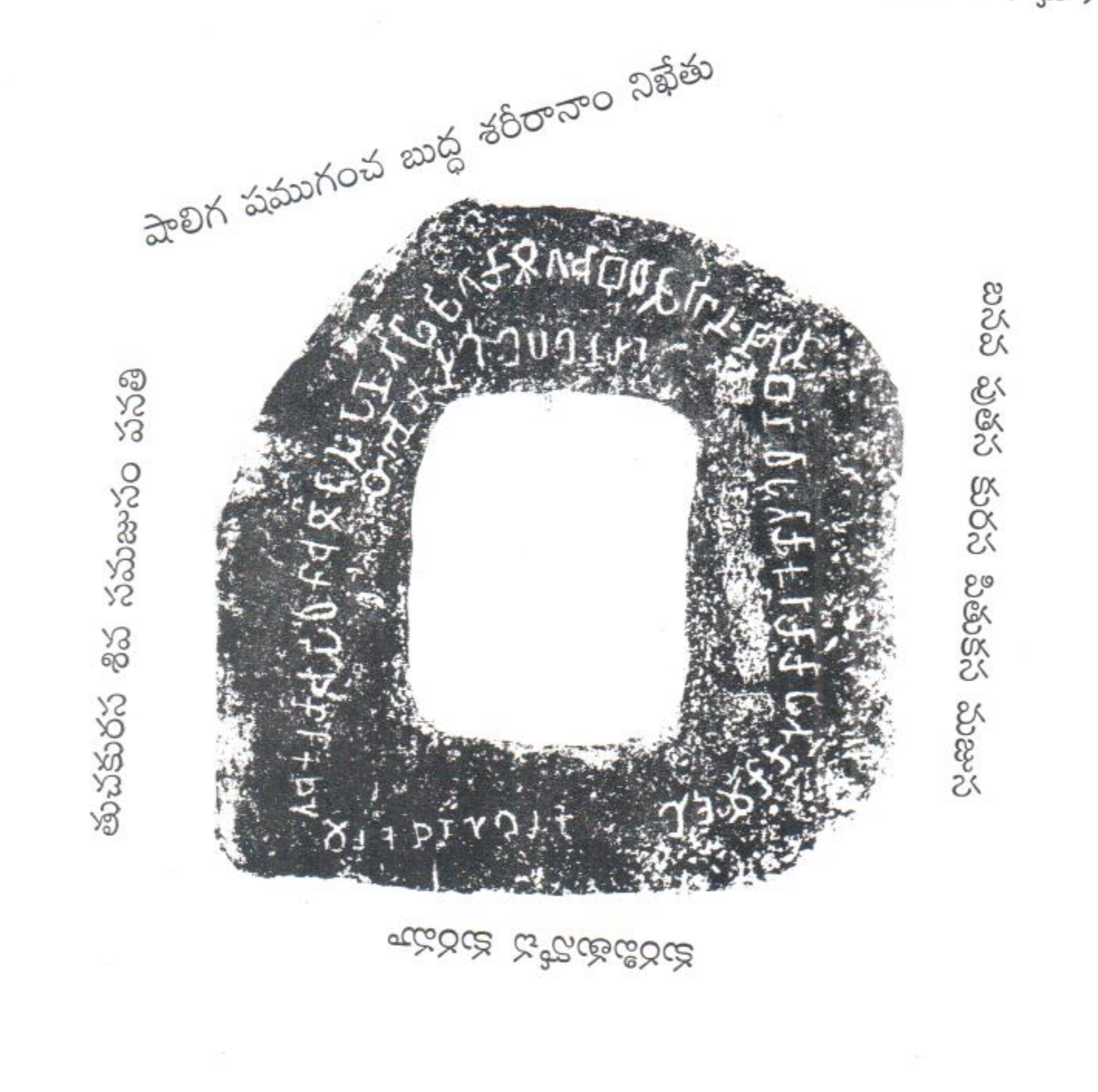
Prakrit stone inscription excavated at Bhattiprolu, Andhra Pradesh date to between the 3rd and 1st centuries BCE.

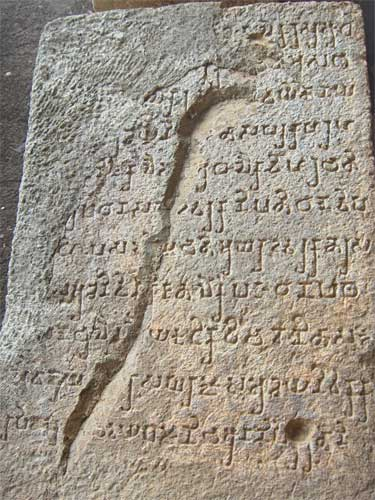
Gupta script from Kanheri Caves

Tamil inscriptions in Vatteluttu script on Red ware Potteries (6th Century CE), Boluvampatti, Coimbatore District, Tamil Nadu

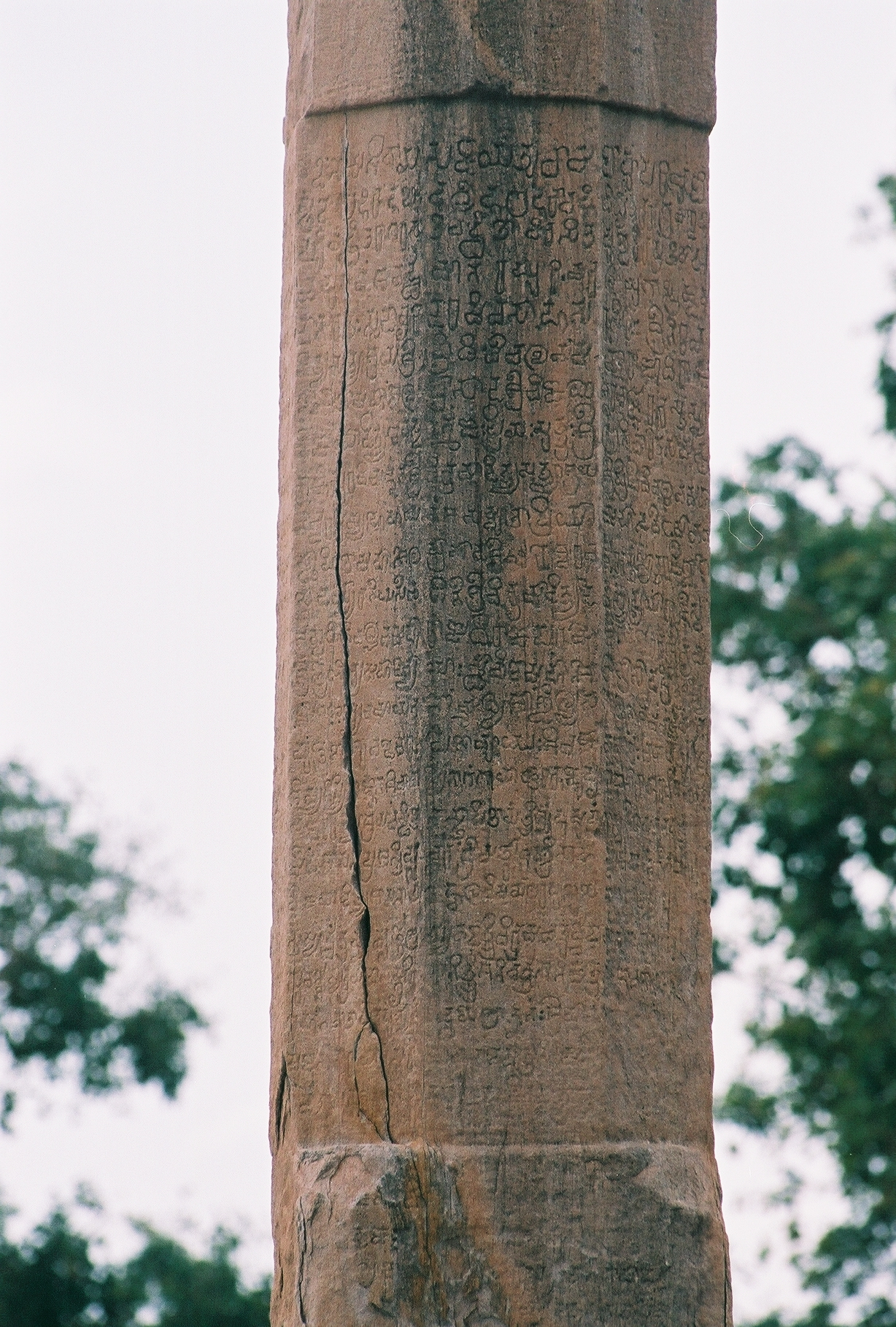
Badami Chalukya pillar inscription in Old Kannada, Virupaksha Temple, 745 CE, Pattadakal

The earliest deciphered epigraphy found in the Indian subcontinent that are accepted by scholarly consensus are the Edicts of Ashoka of the 3rd century BCE, in the Brahmi script.

If epigraphy of proto-writing is included, undeciphered markings with symbol systems that may or may not contain linguistic information, there is substantially older epigraphy in the Indus script, which dates back to the mid 4th millennium BCE. Two other important archeological classes of symbols are found from the 1st millennium BCE, Megalithic graffiti symbols and symbols on punch-marked coins, though some scholars do not consider these to constitute fully linguistic scripts, and their semiotic functions are not well understood.

Writing in Sanskrit (Epigraphical Hybrid Sanskrit, EHS) appears in the 1st to 4th centuries CE. Indian epigraphy becomes more widespread over the 1st millennium, engraved on the faces of cliffs, on pillars, on tablets of stone, drawn in caves and on rocks, some gouged into the bedrock. Later they were also inscribed on palm leaves, coins, Indian copper plate inscriptions, and on temple walls.

Many of the inscriptions are couched in extravagant language, but when the information gained from inscriptions can be corroborated with information from other sources such as still existing monuments or ruins, inscriptions provide insight into India's dynastic history that otherwise lacks contemporary historical records.

Of the c. 100,000 inscriptions found by the Archaeological Survey of India, about 60,000 were in Tamil, about 30,000 to 35,000 were in Kannada, and around 14,000 inscriptions were in Telugu. This makes Tamil the most densely inscribed language in the country.

== First appearance of writing in the Indian Subcontinent ==
The Bronze Age Indus script remains undeciphered and may not actually represent a writing system. Hence, the earliest writing in the Indian subcontinent that is widely accepted by scholarly consensus is the Edicts of Ashoka, dated to approximately 250 BCE. Several inscriptions were thought to be pre-Ashokan by earlier scholars; these include the Tamil-Brahmi, Piprahwa relic casket inscription, the Badli pillar inscription, the Bhattiprolu relic casket inscription, the Sohgaura copper plate inscription, the Eran coin legend, the Taxila coin legends, and the inscription on the silver coins of Sophytes. However, more recent scholars have dated them to later periods.

Until the 1990s, it was generally accepted that the Brahmi script used by Ashoka spread to South India during the second half of the 3rd century BCE, assuming a local form now known as Tamil-Brahmi. Beginning in the late 1990s, archaeological excavations have produced a small number of candidates for Brahmi epigraphy predating Ashoka. Preliminary press reports of such pre-Ashokan inscriptions have appeared over the years, such as Tamil Inscriptions from Sivagalai, Palani, Erode, and Adichanallur, dated to c. 685-500 BCE, but so far only the claimed pre-Ashokan inscriptions at Anuradhapura have been published in an internationally recognised academic journal.

== History and research ==
Since 1886 there have been systematic attempts to collect and catalogue these inscriptions, along with the translation and publication of documents. Inscriptions are in the Brahmi. Royal inscriptions were also engraved on copper-plates as were the Indian copper plate inscriptions. The Edicts of Ashoka contain Brahmi script and its regional variant, was an early script used in the inscriptions in cave walls of Tamil Nadu and later evolved into the Tamil Vatteluttu alphabet. The Bhattiprolu alphabet, as well as a variant of Brahmi, the Kadamba alphabet, of the early centuries BCE gave rise to the Telugu-Kannada alphabet, which developed into the Kannada and Telugu scripts.

== Notable inscriptions ==
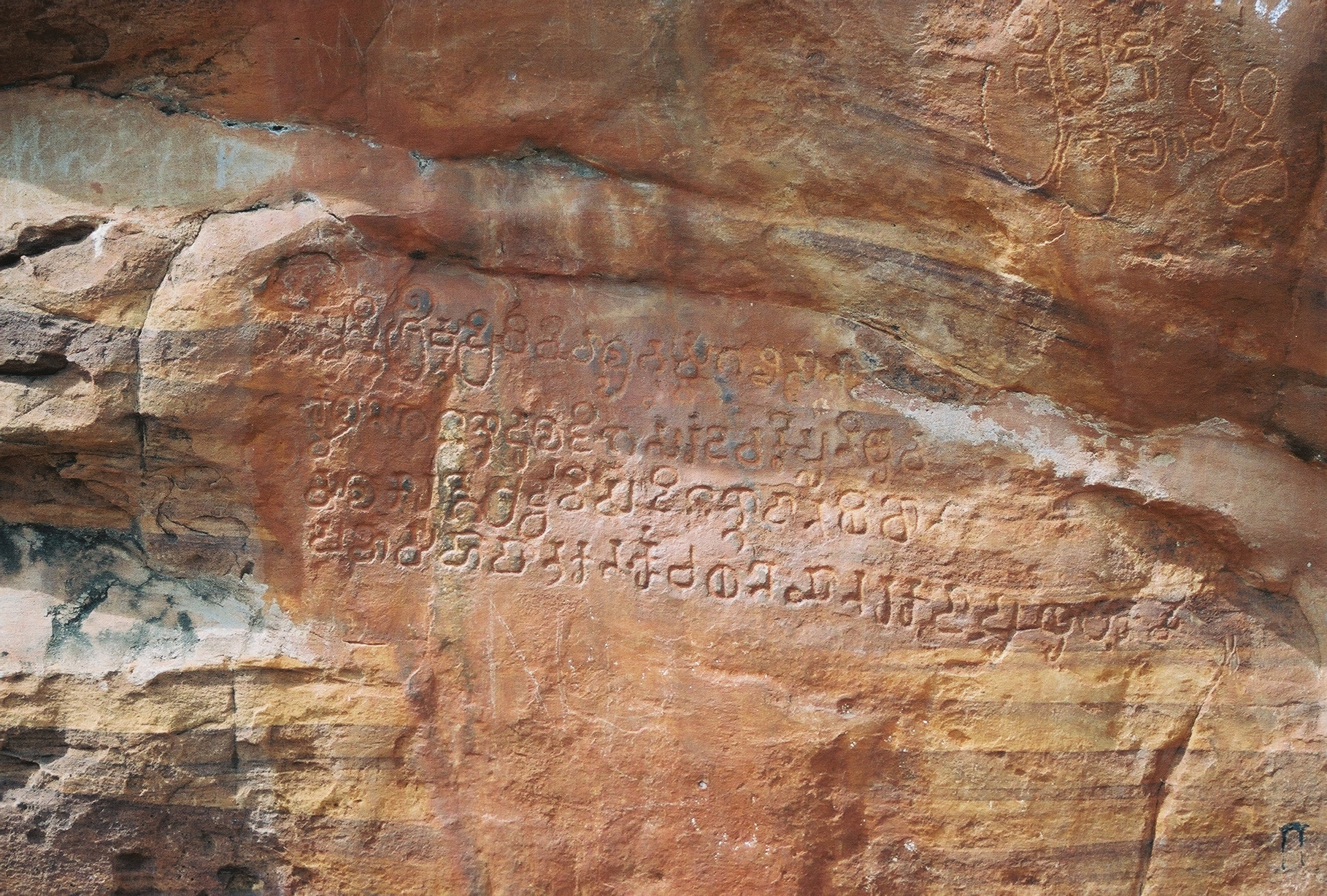
Old Kannada inscription, Badami cave temple (578 CE).

Important inscriptions include the 33 inscriptions of emperor Ashoka on the Pillars of Ashoka (272 to 231 BCE), the Sohgaura copper plate inscription (earliest known example of the copper plate type and generally assigned to the Mauryan period, though the exact date is uncertain), The Mangulam Tamil-Brahmi inscriptions in Tamil Nadu, dated to the 3rd century BCE, which mention the Pandya king Nedunjeliyan I and record the provision of stone beds for Jain ascetics. The Hathigumpha inscription of Kharavela (2nd century BCE), the Besnagar pillar inscription of Heliodorus, the Junagadh rock inscription of Rudradaman I (150 CE), the Nasik cave inscriptions, the Rabatak inscription, the Allahabad Pillar inscription of Samudragupta, the Aihole inscription of Pulakesi II (634 CE), the Kannada Halmidi inscription, and the Tamil copper-plate inscriptions. The oldest known inscription in the Kannada language, referred to as the Halmidi inscription for the tiny village of Halmidi near where it was found, consists of sixteen lines carved on a sandstone pillar and dates to 450 CE. Reports indicate that the Nishadi Inscription. of Chandragiri which is in Old-Kannada is older than Halmidi by about 50 to 100 years and may belong to c. 350 CE or c. 400 CE.

=== Hathigumpha inscription ===
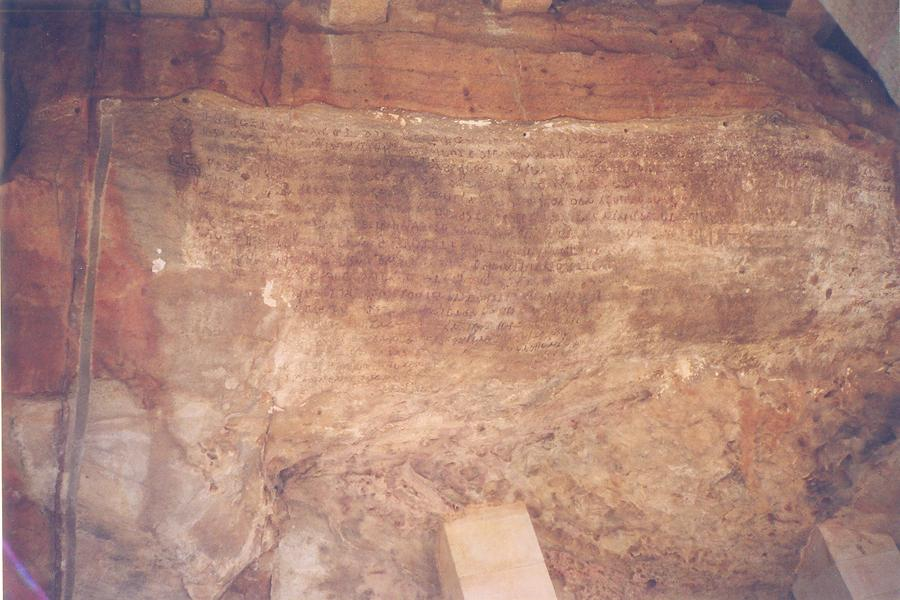
Hathigumpha inscription, Odisha

The Hathigumpha inscription ("Elephant Cave" inscription) from Udayagiri near Bhubaneshwar in Orissa was written by Kharavela, the king of Kalinga in India during the 2nd century BCE. The Hathigumpha inscription consists of seventeen lines incised in deep cut Brahmi letters on the overhanging brow of a natural cavern called Hathigumpha on the southern side of the Udayagiri hill near Bhubaneswar in Orissa. It faces straight toward the rock Edicts of Asoka at Dhauli located about six miles away.

=== Mahasthan inscription ===
The Mahasthan Brahmi Inscription is written in the Prakrit language in the Brahmi script. It details an administrative order from an imperial administrator to a bureaucrat to stock up rice, oil, shell currency, and punch-marked coins in preparation for an emergency situation like a flood, famine, fire, or any natural disaster. It also orders relief for a distressed segment of the population. It was discovered in the ruins of the city of Pundranagara in Mahasthangarh in 1931. It is the earliest epigraphic record in the Bengal region. Most scholars consider the stone to be a mark of Mauryan sovereignty.

=== Rabatak inscription ===
The Rabatak inscription is written on a rock in the Bactrian language and Greek script and found in 1993 at the site of Rabatak, near Surkh Kotal in Afghanistan. The inscription relates to the rule of the Kushan emperor Kanishka and gives remarkable clues to the genealogy of the Kushan dynasty.

=== Halmidi inscription ===
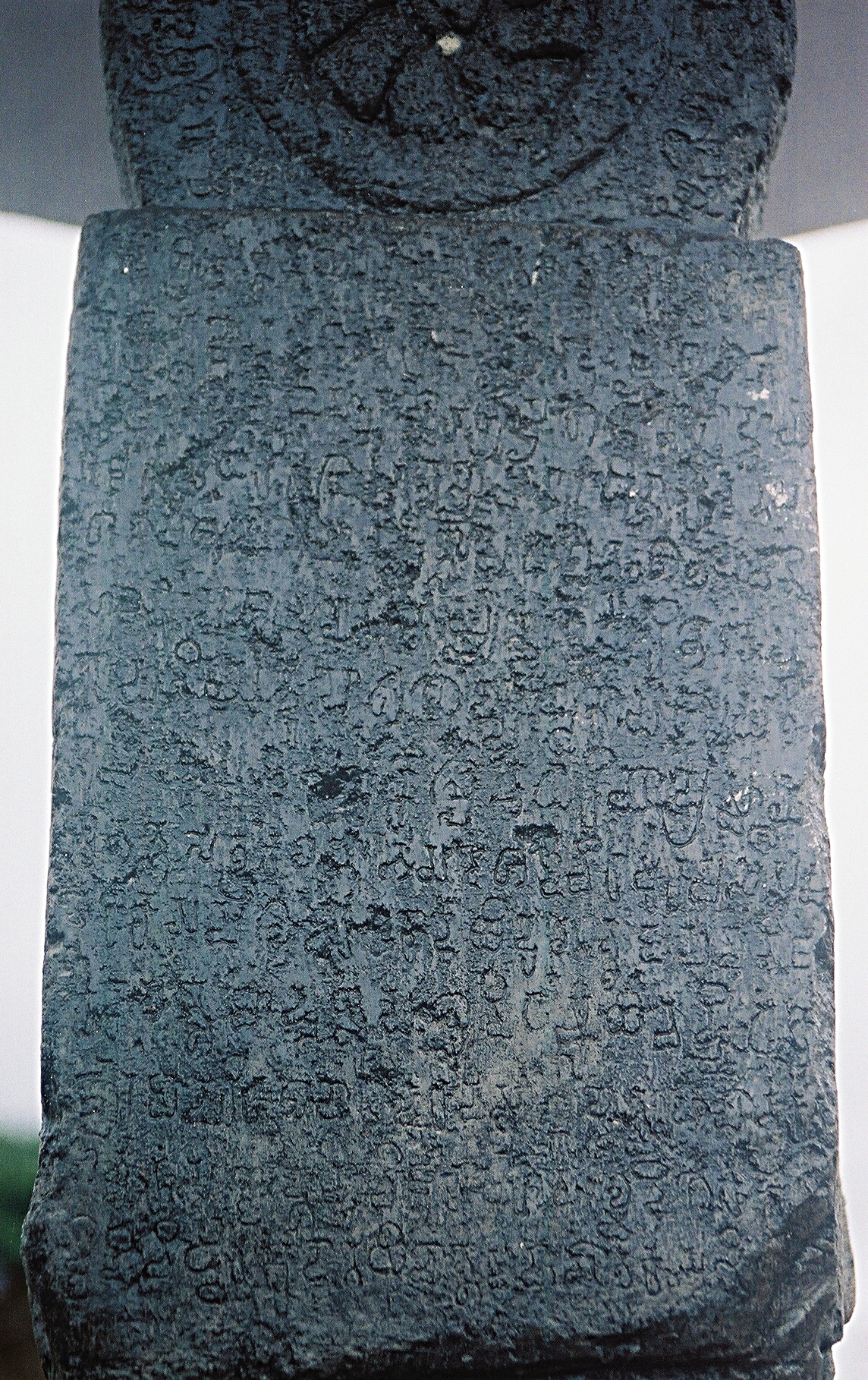
Halmidi Inscription in old Kannada (c.450-500 CE). A replica at Halmidi village. The original is at the Bangalore museum

The Halmidi inscription is the oldest known inscription in the Kannada language. The inscription is carved on a pillar, that was discovered in the village of Halmidi, a few miles from the famous temple town of Belur in the Hassan district of Karnataka, and is dated 450 CE. The original inscription has now been deposited in an archaeological museum in Bangalore while a fibreglass replica has been installed at Halmidi.

=== Tamil copper-plate inscriptions ===
Tamil copper-plate inscriptions are mostly records of grants of villages or plots of cultivable lands to private individuals or public institutions by the members of the various South Indian royal dynasties. The grants range in date from the 10th century CE to the mid-19th century CE. A large number of them belong to the Cholas and the Vijayanagara kings. These plates are valuable epigraphically as they give us an insight into the social conditions of medieval South India and help fill chronological gaps to connect the history of the ruling dynasties.

Vijayanagara Tamil Copper Plate Inscriptions at the Dharmeshwara Temple, Kondarahalli, Hoskote

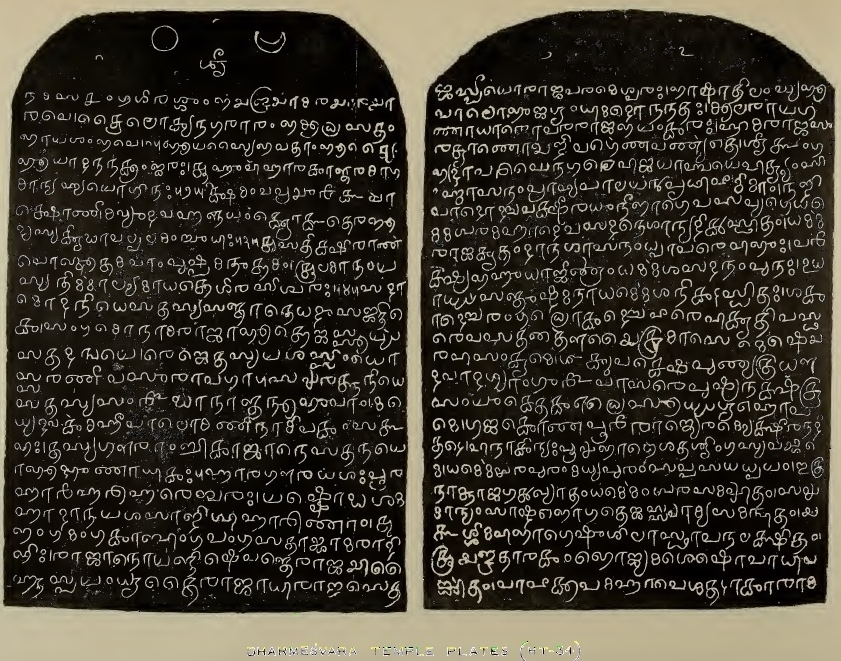
Plate 1 and Back

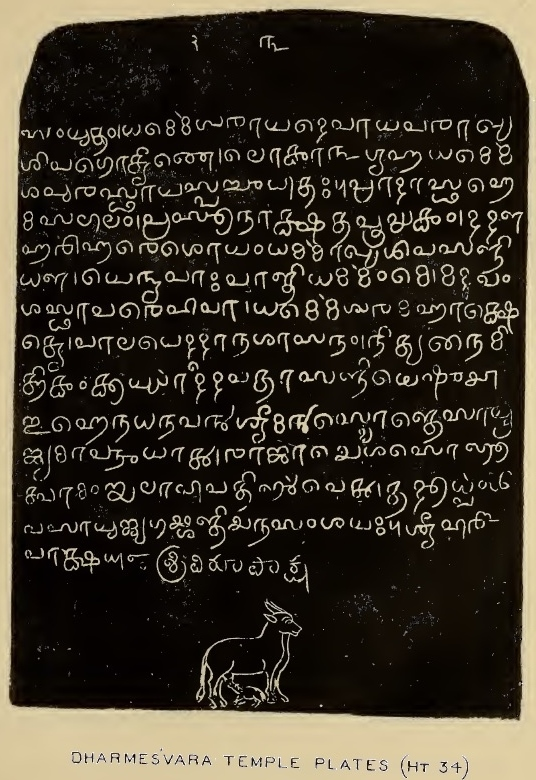
Plate 2

Unlike the neighbouring states where early inscriptions were written in Sanskrit and Prakrit, the early inscriptions in Tamil Nadu used Tamil. Tamil has the extant literature amongst the Dravidian languages, but dating the language and the literature precisely is difficult. Literary works in India were preserved either in palm leaf manuscripts (implying repeated copying and recopying) or through oral transmission, making direct dating impossible. External chronological records and internal linguistic evidence, however, indicate that extant works were probably compiled sometime between the 4th century BCE and the 3rd century CE. Epigraphic attestation of Tamil begins with rock inscriptions from the 3rd century BCE, written in Tamil-Brahmi, an adapted form of the Brahmi script. The earliest extant literary text is the Tolkāppiyam, a work on poetics and grammar which describes the language of the classical period, dated variously between the 5th century BCE and the 2nd century CE.

=== Shankarpur copper-plate of Budhagupta ===
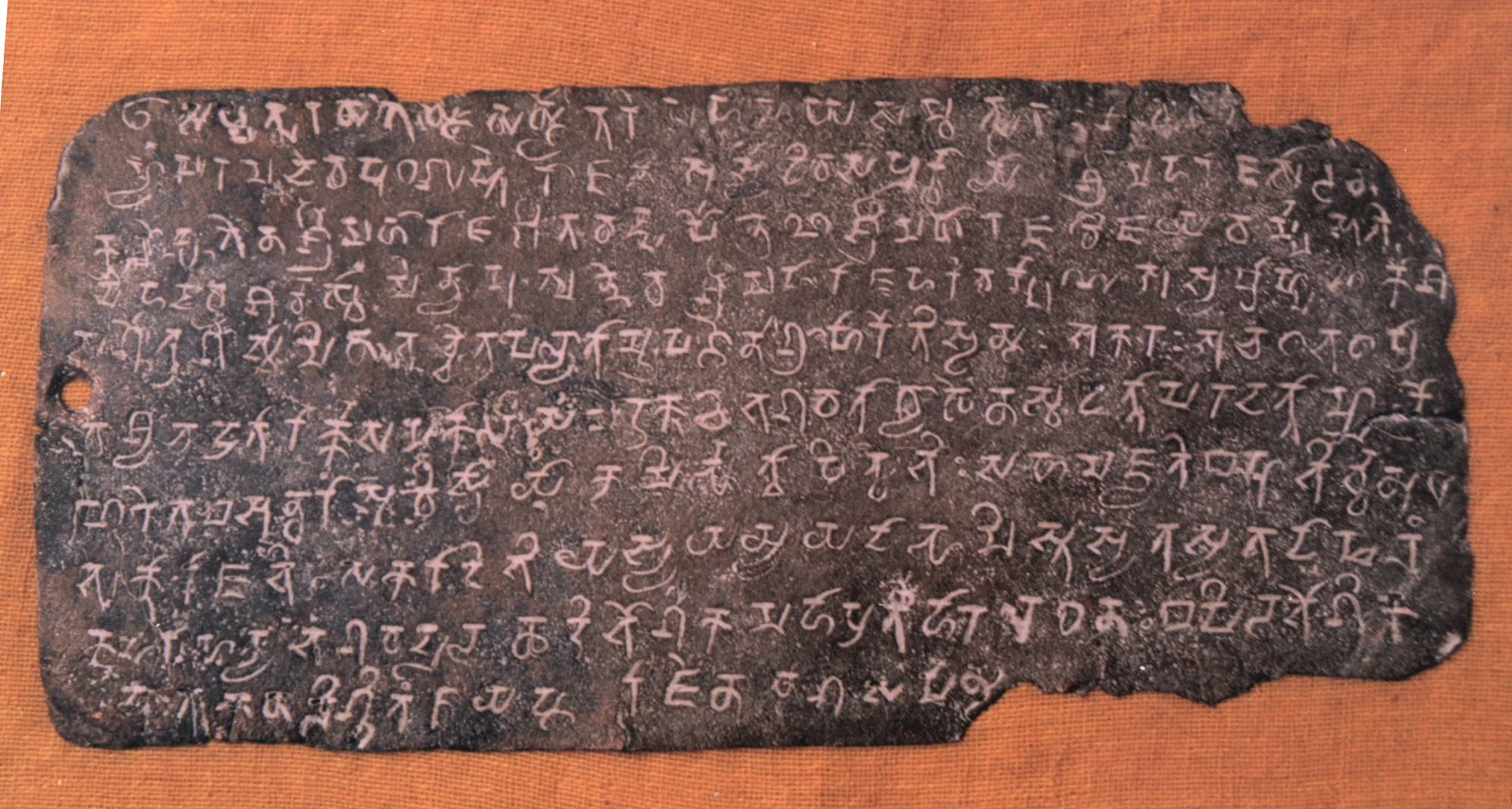
Copper-plate charter of Budhagupta, dated Gupta year 168

The plate is a record documenting a donation in the reign of king Budhagupta (circa CE 477–88) in year 168 of the Gupta era. The date is equivalent to CE 487–88. The plate was found in Shankarpur, Sidhi District, Madhya Pradesh, India. The plate is currently stored in the Rani Durgawati Museum, Jabalpur, Madhya Pradesh. The copper plate is 24 cm x 11 cm. The inscription on the plate records that in the reign of Budhagupta, a ruler named mahārāja Gītavarman, grandson of mahārāja Vijayavarman and mahārāja Harivarman son of Rānī Svaminī and mahārāja Harivarman, donated a village named Citrapalli to a Gosvāmi brāhmaṇa. The text was written by Dūtaka Rūparāja(?), son of Nāgaśarma.

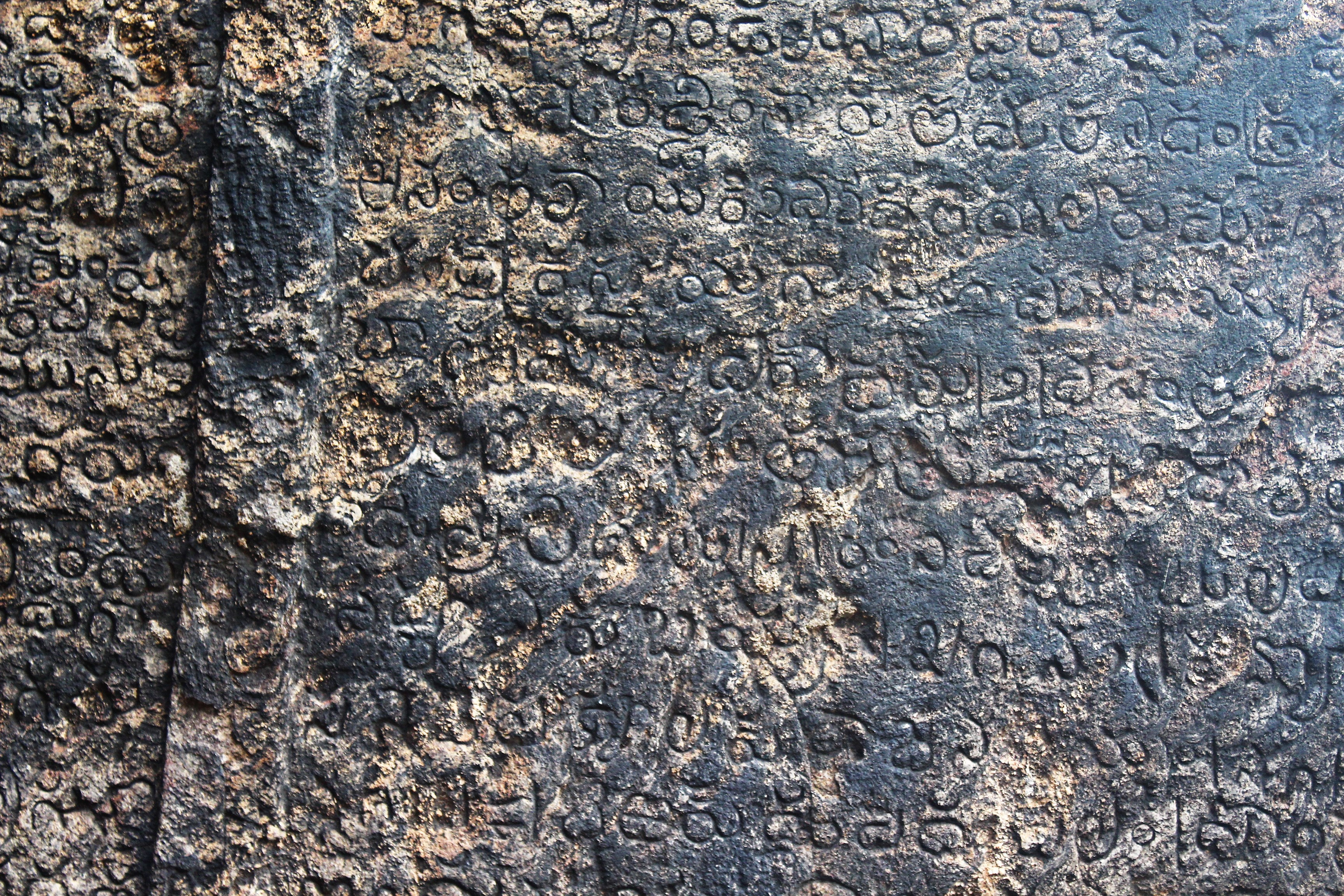
Wall writings at Undavalli Caves

The inscription was published by B. C. Jain in 1977. It was subsequently listed by Madan Mohan Upadhyaya in his book Inscriptions of Mahakoshal.

The inscription is of considerable importance for the history of the Gupta Empire, because it is the last known record of the later Gupta king Budhagupta. Moreover, it provides a secure date for Harivarman, the first recorded king of the Maukhari dynasty according to the Asīrgarh seal.

siddham [||] samvatsara-ṣa(śa)te=ṣṭsa=ṣaṣṭyuta (yutta)re mahāmāgha-samvatsara(re) Śrāvaṇa ...

myāṃ paramadeva-Budhagupte rājani asyāṃ divasa-pūrvāyāṃ śrī-mahārāja-Sāṭana Sāla (or rya) na kul-odbhūtena śrī-mahārāja [Gī]tavarman-pautreṇa śrīmahārāja-Vijayavarmma-sute[na] mahādevyā[ṃ] Śarv asvāminyām utpanneana śri mahārāja Harivarmmaṇā asya brāhmaṇa-Kautsa- sagotra-gosvāmina [e]tac=Citrapalya tāmu(mra)paṭṭen=āgrahāro-tisṛṣṭaḥ akaraḥ acaṭa-bhaṭṭa-pra- veśyaḥ [|*] candra-tār-ārkka-samakālīyaḥ uktañca bhagavatā vyāsena [|*] svadattām= paradattāṃ=vā yo hareta vasundharā(rāṃ) [|*] s(ś)va vis(ṣ)ṭhāyā(yāṃ) kṛmir=bhūtvā pitṛbhis=saha majyate [||*] bahubhirv=vasudhā bhuktā rājabhiḥ=sagar-ādibhi (bhiḥ) [|*] yasya yasya yadā bhūmis=tasya tasya tadā phalaṃ [||*] kumārāmatya-bhagavad-rudrachadi-bhogika-mahāpratīhāra-lavaṇaḥ bapidra-bhogika (ke) [na]

dūtaka(ke)na likhitaṃ Śrī Yaṣṭarājena Nāga(sa)śarma-su[tena] [||*]

== See also ==
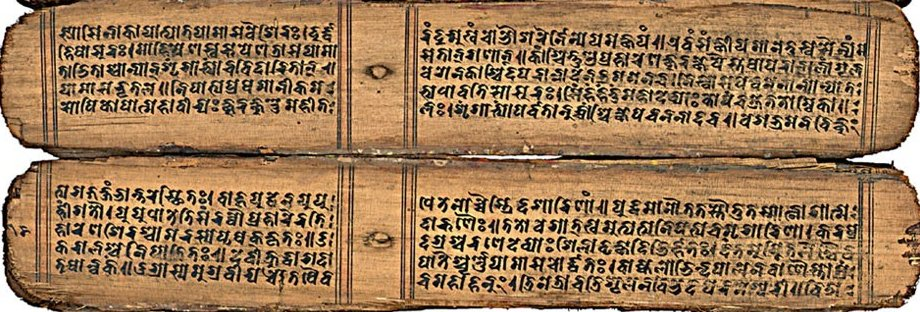
Hindu scripture manuscript on palm-leaf, in an early Sanskrit script, 11th century.

- Related topics
  - Ancient inscriptions Of Raju Rulers
  - Ancient iron production
  - Ashokan Edicts in Delhi
  - Ashoka's Major Rock Edicts
  - Dhar iron pillar
  - History of metallurgy in South Asia
  - Iron pillar of Delhi
  - Junagadh rock inscription of Rudradaman
  - List of Edicts of Ashoka
  - Pillars of Ashoka
  - Stambha
  - Tosham rock inscription
  - Tamil inscriptions
- Other similar topics
  - Early Indians
  - Brāhmī script
  - Heliodorus pillar
  - Indus script
  - List of Indus Valley Civilization sites
  - Hindu temple architecture
  - History of India
  - Indian copper plate inscriptions
  - Indian rock-cut architecture
  - List of rock-cut temples in India
  - Outline of ancient India
  - South Indian Inscriptions
  - Tagundaing
