= Sohgaura copper plate inscription =

Ancient artifact from India

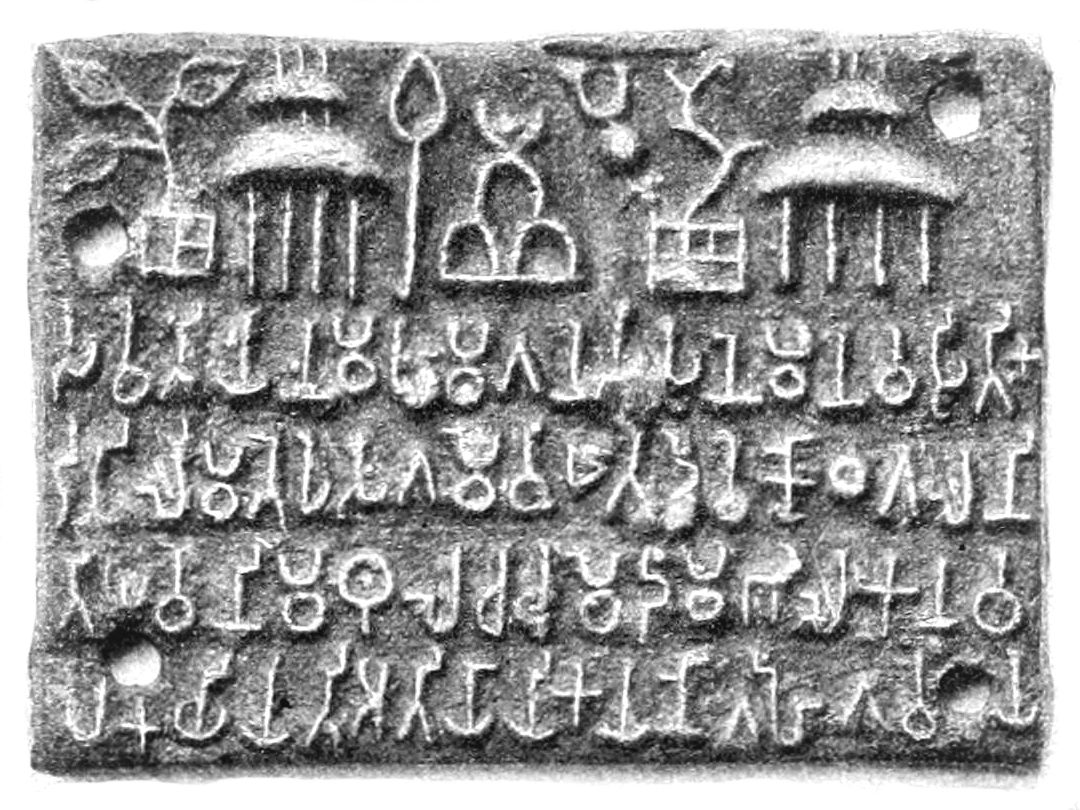
- The Sohgaura copper plate.
- Material: Copper plate
- Writing: Brahmi script
- Created: 3rd century BCE
- Period/culture: 3rd Century BCE
- Discovered: 26.57°N 83.48°E
- Place: India
- Present location: Sohgaura

Location

The Sohgaura copper plate inscription is an Indian copper plate inscription written in Prakrit in the Mauryan period Brahmi script. It was discovered in Sohgaura, a village on the banks of the Rapti River, about 20 km south-east of Gorakhpur, in the Gorakhpur District, Uttar Pradesh, India. The inscription describes the establishment of three granaries for the public during times of famine and scarcity. It discusses relief efforts undertaken by Chandragupta Maurya during a period of famine. Scholars agree that punchmarked coins featuring a three-arched crescent atop symbol known as Rajanka or Meru symbol, found at Kumrahar (Patna) also mentioned on the Sahgaura copper-plate, were issued during Chandragupta Maurya's reign.

The inscription first one is a usual crescent on-hill symbol which is generally found on Mauryan silver punch marked coins, and also found on the base of a Kumhrar pillar and on many other antiquities. Jayaswal reads it as the monogram of Chandragupta Maurya. He takes the top crescent as Chandra and the remaining hill like combination for gutta; the upper loop for ga- ∩ and the two lower loops ∩∩ for double tta making it Chandragutta.

The plate, consisting of a line of symbolic drawings and four lines of text, is the result of a molding. The inscription is sometimes presented as pre-Ashokan, even pre-Mauryan, but the writing of the plate, especially the configuration of akshara would rather suggest a date after Ashoka. Archaeologist Raymond Allchin believes it to be from Ashoka's period, and considers it to be a precursor of the later copper-plate inscriptions.

== Inscription ==
The text of the plate has been translated as follows. Its mentions the establishment of two grain depots (Kosthagara) to fight against famine.

Sāvatiyānam Mahāma(ttā)nam sāsane Mānavāsītika-
ḍasilimate Ussagāme va ete duve koṭṭhāgālāni
tina-yavāni maṃthulloca-chammā-dāma-bhālakān(i)va
laṃ kayiyati atiyāyikāya no gahi(ta)vvāya

- The order of the Mahamatras of Shravasti issued from the Manavasiti camp. Only to the tenants, only on the advent of drought, these (the) dravya store houses of Triveni, Mathura, Chanchu, Modama and Bhadra are to the distributed, in case of distress they are not to be withheld.
  —Translated by Jayaswal
- At the junction called Manawasi,
  these two storehouses are prepared,
  for the sheltering of loads of commodities,
  of Tiyavani, Mathura and Chanchu.
  — Translated by Fleet

This is the oldest Indian copper plate inscription known.

== See also ==
- Indian epigraphy
