= Piprahawa =

Coordinates: 27°59′N 81°43′E

Piprahawa पिपरहवा
- Village development committee
- Interactive map of Piprahawa
- Country: Nepal
- Province: Lumbini Province
- District: Rupandehi District

Population (1991)
  - Total: 3,181
- Time zone: UTC+5:45 (Nepal Time)

Piprahawa is a village development committee in Rupandehi District in Lumbini Province of southern Nepal. At the time of the 1991 Nepal census it had a population of 3181 people living in 489 individual households.
