= Early Telugu epigraphy =

Historians have deciphered writings on the walls of temples describing the names and gotras (family groupings) of some Telugu rulers and the contributions made by them to the temples and towns.

== Ancient inscriptions ==
=== Vishnukundina ===
- No. 1. (A. R. No. 581 of 1925) On a white marble pillar near the entrance into the temple of Ramalingasvami at Velpuru, Sattenpalli Taluk, Guntur District. Undated.

This is the only stone inscription of this dynasty so far found and it is damaged and incomplete. Only the name of the family Vishnukundi and that of a ruler Madhava Varma are legible.

=== Western Chalukya dynasty ===
- No. 245. On a broken pillar lying near the old Shiva temple, outside the village of Bekkallu, Jangaon Taluk, Warangal District. 11th century A.D.

Composed in Telugu verse and prose, this inscription introduces Reviraddi of the fourth caste and his son, Chamdireddi. It records that Mallireddy, the son of Reviraddi's friend Punnireddy, established a Jain temple and a trikuta (a combination of 21 shrines) in Vrekkallu, endowing them with various gifts during the reign of the Chalukya king Tribhuvanamalladeva.

- No. 307. On a stone set up near the ruined Jain temple outside the village of Bairanapalli, Warangal District. A.D. 1108.

Registers the installation of the Jaina image and the gifts of a mango garden, 20 mattars of Karamba land and other lands for the repairs of the temple and feeding of the ascetics by Biramaraddi the dandanayak of the capital Bhuvanagiri and the two Karaṇams of Bekkallu. At the end of the inscription there is a lengthy description of the donor in Kannada verse wherein it is said that the donor belonged to Vitti vamsa of the raddi caste. Other gifts to the same Jinalaya by Punnireddi of Nanganuru and Reviraddi of Vellamepatla are recorded.

- No. 27. (A. R. No. 596 of 1909.) On the Naga pillar in the temple of Virabhadra outside the village of Gurazala, Palnadu Taluk, same District. S. [10]51.

States that a Brahmin named Dara son of Kommana who was the head of Kummunuru village and who claimed to be an incarnation of the serpent king Sesha, put up a Naga-stambha in front of the temple of Brahma, Vishnu, and Siva built by himself and that Betabhupa of the Haihaya family, a dependent of Bhulo Kamalla Deva (Someshvara III) made a gift of four kharis of land to the said temple.

=== Eastern Chalukya dynasty ===
- No. 4. (A. R. No. 431 of 1915) On a nandi slab set up near the temple of Someshvara at Eluru, Narasaraopeta Taluk, Same District. S. 925.

Records the grant of land to god Somanathadeva by Paricheda Chikka Bhimaraju.

=== Chola dynasty ===
- No. 64. (A. R. No. 567 of 1925.) On a big white marble pillar set up near the dhvajastambha in the temple of Ramalingesvara, Velpuru, Sattenepalli Taluk, Guntur District. S. 1030

Records the gift of a perpetual lamp by Kota Gokaraju son of Bhima to the temple of Ramesvara of Velupuru.

=== Kakatiya dynasty ===
- No. 307. On a stone set up near the ruined Jain temple outside the village.

Registers the installation of the Jaina image and the gifts of a mango garden, 20 mattars of Karamba land and other lands for the repairs of the temple and feeding of the ascetics by Biramaraddi the dandanayak of the capital Bhuvanagiri and the two Karaṇams of Bekkallu. At the end of the inscription there is a lengthy description of the donor in Kannada verse wherein it is said that the donor belonged to Vitti vamsa of the raddi caste. Other gifts to the same Jinalaya by Punnireddi of Nanganuru and Reviraddi of Vellamepatla are recorded.

- No. 118. On a pillar lying near the old Mutyalamma temple

Gives the prasasti of the chief Mahasamanta Kat-reddi and records the gift of the village Nagavuramu for the amga-bhoga and rangabhoga of Lokesvara Deva of Urukonda for his father Kami-reddi`s attainment of Sivaloka.

- No. 101. On a stone in the old Shiva temple near Musi river.

Records that Recherla Beti Reddi and two others granted for the anga and ranga-bhogas of Sri Swayambhu Somanatha, a tank. Betireddi constructed a kalva behind the tank.

- No. 99. On a wall first from the bottom the Bhimeswara temple, dated Saka 113[4] Vaisakha. su. Ekadashi, sunday.

Mentions about Raja namakundu, feudatory of Recherla Rudra, who is the feudatory of Kakatiyas, donated 50 buffaloes to provide ghee for the perpetual lamp of the Shree Bhimesvaradevara, in the merit of his own parents.

- No. 88. On a stone Komaresvara temple. Dated S. 1130. Vibhava, Jyestha su. 3, Monday (A.D. 1208, May 10).

This also belongs to the members of the same family. Errakkasanamma, wife of Recherla Betireddi established the temple of Erakesvara and made grants of land for the upkeep of the various parts of the temple servants, matha and conducting the worship in the temple. There was another inscription in the same place dated S. 1130, Vibhava, Jyestha su. 3, Monday. (A.D. 1208, May 9), which does not have any text.

- No. 395. (A. R. No. 94 of 1917.) On the huge Nandi pillar lying near the ruined temple in Malkapuram, Guntur Taluk, Guntur District. (Published in the Journal of the Andhra Historical Research Society, Vol. IV, pp. 147–64.) S. 1183. (Durmati)

Gives a detailed account of the Kakatiya family and of the foundation and pontifical succession of the Golaki-matha of the Saivas and states that king Ganapatideva promised the village of Mandara in the Velanadu-Kandravati country to his guru Visvesvara Sivacharya and that Ganapati's daughter Rudramadevi made a formal gift of that village along with the village of Velangapundi, that Visvesvara Siva established a new village with the name of Visvesvara-Golaki and peopled it with person of different castes brought from various parts of the country, that he also established the temple of Visvesvara, a Sanskrit college, a matha for Saivas, a choultry for feeding people without distinction of caste and creed, a general land a maternity hospital, besides some other things and that he made grants of land for the maintenance of all these institutions. Gives a detailed description of the administration of the trust and of the village affairs. Incidentally, it mentions a large number of other religious and charitable institutions established by Visvesvara Siva in several other places.

- No. 38. On a pillar in the midst of the village of Irvin, Kalwakurthy Taluk, Mahabubnagar District. 26th December, A.D. 1271.

Records a gift of land to the deity Indresvara by the mahasamanta (feudatory chief) Vavilala Rudraya reddi for the merit of his sister, Rudrasani. Issued during the reigns of Rudradeva and Immadi Bolla Reddi, the inscription is notable for mentioning matrimonial alliances between the Cheraku and Vavilala families.

=== Reddi Kingdom ===
- Kandukur No. 15. On a stone outside the Ramalingasvami temple at Old Chundi, Kandukur Taluk, Nellore District. Dated to the cyclic year Raktakshi, month of Chaitra, 2nd tithi.

Composed primarily in Sanskrit using Telugu characters (with the granted fields described in Telugu), this inscription provides a detailed genealogy of the Panta Reddi clan. It records that from the Panta Reddi race arose Alla (or Anna) Bhupati, a ruler who crushed his enemies. He was succeeded by his son, the victorious king Vema, who was praised for ruling so justly that he turned the Kali Yuga into a golden age (Kritayuga), and was compared to Yama in battle and Revanta in horsemanship. Vema had eleven sons, the most prominent being Malla Bhupa, who was renowned for his devotion to Lord Siva and for founding a settlement for his castemen. The inscription registers that Malla Bhupa caused a two-roomed mansion for the deity Umesvara to be constructed by the residents of Chundi town for the merit of his deceased father. Additionally, it records the perpetual grant of the village to the deity Bhimesalinga.

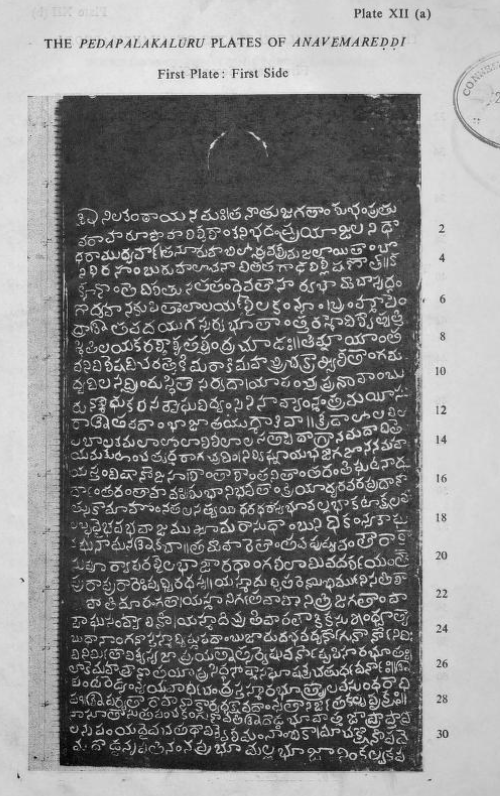
The first side of the first Pedapalakaluru copper plate. As seen in the 17th line of the Sanskrit text, the inscription explicitly mentions the Pantareddanvaya (Panta Reddi clan), confirming the origins of the Kondavidu Reddi kings.

- The Pedapalakaluru Plates. Discovered at Pedapalakaluru, Guntur District (now housed at the State Archaeological Museum, Hyderabad). 4th December, 1378 A.D. (Saka 1300).

Composed in Sanskrit and Telugu, this copper-plate grant was issued by King Anavema Reddi of the Kondavidu line during a lunar eclipse. The inscription extensively praises his lineage, tracing the origin of the Kondavidu kings to the Panta Reddi clan of the fourth caste (Chaturtha Varna). The genealogy begins with King Prola, who is said to have excelled the celestial Kalpa Vrikshas in his charity, and his queen Annambika. They had five sons, the most prominent being King Vema. Vema is highly eulogized: the inscription poetically claims that the golden mountain began to float in the sheer volume of water he poured during his charitable donations. Under his rule, Brahmins were highly encouraged to perform numerous Yajnas (sacrifices) offering Havis to satisfy the Devas. Vema granted Agraharas along the Tungabhadra, Krishna, and Godavari rivers, and built stone steps at Srigiri and Ahobilagiri, which served as his permanent pillars of victory. His son, Anavema, bearing the fierce title Virasri Jaganobba Ganda, is described as a Rudramurti whose Jaitra Bheri (victory drum) terrified enemy kings. The inscription concludes by recording Anavema's grant of the Pedapalakaluru village to the great scholar Ahobala Pandit.

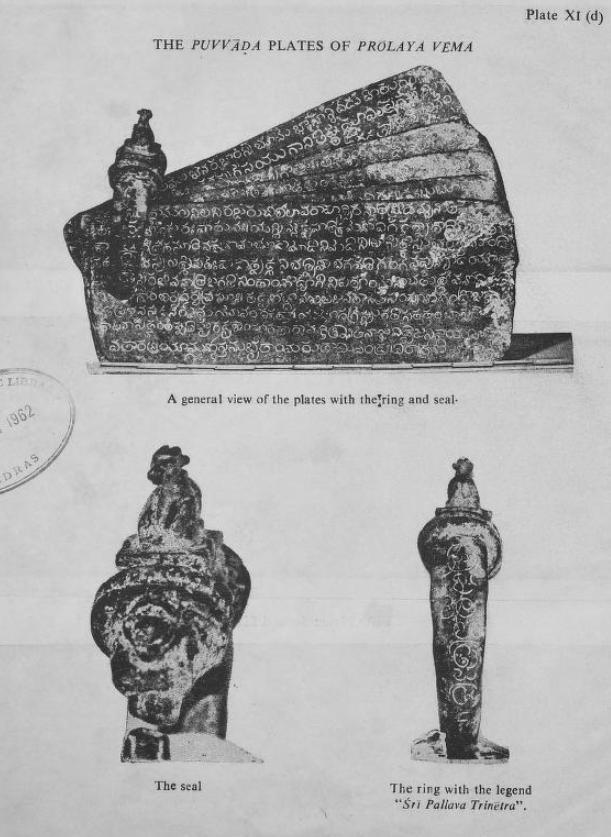
A general view of the five-plate Puvvada copper grant of King Prolaya Vema, held together by the royal ring and Nandi seal.

- The Puvvada Grant. Discovered in an old well in Tenali Taluk, Guntur District (now at the State Archaeological Museum, Hyderabad). 1346 A.D. (Saka 1268).

Composed primarily in Sanskrit using medieval Telugu characters, this five-plate copper grant was issued by King Vema Bhupala (Prolaya Vema) of the Kondavidu Reddi dynasty. The inscription details the dynasty's origins in the fourth caste (Chaturtha Varna). King Vema Bhupala, ruling from Addanki, is highly eulogized for his martial prowess, particularly through a vivid verse in the Sragdhara metre that compares his sword (Mandalagra) to Lord Shiva performing the fierce cosmic dance (Prachanda Tandava). The verse describes the nerves and intestines of slain enemy kings clinging to the blade as Shiva's flowing locks of hair (Ghana Jata). The white powder from the smashed pearls of enemy war-elephants, caked onto the sword, is likened to the sacred ash (Bhuti or Vibhuti) smeared on the deity's body. Furthermore, the metallic clashing of the blade (Jhana Jhana and Krinkrita) is compared to Shiva's loud cosmic laughter (Attahasa), and the ghosts of the fallen (Bhuta Betalas) are said to surround the sword just as the Pramatha Ganas surround the Lord.

Beyond this striking martial imagery, the king is described as "Mlecchabdikhumbodva", i.e.; a veritable Agastya who dried up the ocean of the Mlecchas (Muslim invaders). The grant also records his architectural and charitable achievements, noting that he constructed the flight of steps to the Patalaganga river at Srisailam, and that his immense charity drenched the earth, surpassing King Bali. Bearing the royal title Pallava Trinetra, the king granted the village of Puvvada (renaming it Vemapuri) to 61 learned Brahmins, dividing it into 64 shares.

=== Eastern Ganga ===
- No. 651. (A. R. No. 99 of 1909.) On a stone lying near Paravastu Rangacharya's house at Vizagapatam. S. 101[3] (h) 17th year of Ananta Varma Deva.

Records the gift of “perumbadi” (?) by the "city twelve" of Visakhapattanamu alias Kulottunga-Chodapattanamu to Matamana of Malamandala. The description of the donor is not quite intelligible.

- No. 675 (A. R. No. 681 of 1926.) On a pillar in the mandapa in front of the central shrine in the temple of Nilakanthesvara, Narayanapuram, Bobbili Taluk, same District. S. 1053.

Records gift of a perpetual lamp by Chodaraju Maha Devi (and another ?) to the temple of Nilisvara for the merit of Chodagangadeva.

- No. 727. (A. R. No. 827 of 1917.) On a stone lying at the entrance into the temple of Tumbesvara, Pratapur, Chatrapur Taluk, Ganjam District. Year missing. Incomplete.

Mentions. Ananta Varma

=== Gajapati ===
- No. 732. (A. R. No. 802 of 1922.) On the four faces of the Garuda-pillar planted near the dhvajastambha in the temple of Chennakesava, Idupulapadu, same Taluk and District. S. 1422. (Raudri)

Records the gift by Pratapa-Radra of the village Idvulapadu to the east of Vinikonda, to Madhava-mantrin of the Bharadvaja-gotra and the Yajnyavalkya-saka. Gives a genealogy of the Gajapatis and of the donor.

- No. 733. (A. R. No. 375 of 1926.) On a stone built into a gate of the fort at Tangeda, Palnad Taluk, same District. S. 14[3]1 (Sukla)

Damaged. Unintelligible; Mentions some Khan. States that Pratapa-Rudradeva Gajapati was ruling.

- No. 741. (A. R. No. 54 of 1912.) On a pillar in the temple of Kesavasvami at Chodavaram, Viravalli Taluk, Vizagapatam District. Saka year not given (Kalayukti)

Records the consecration of the image of Garutmanta by Bondu Mallayya for the prosperity etc. of Bhupatiraju Vallabha Raju-Mahapatra.

=== Vijayanagara dynasty ===
==== Krishna Deva Raya ====
- No. 45. (A.R. No. 491 of 1906.) Pulivendla, Pulivendla Taluk, Cuddapah District. On a slab set up at the entrance of the Ranganathasvamin temple. Krishnaraya, AD 1509. This is dated Saka 1431, Sukla, Kartika su. 12, Monday, corresponding to AD 1509, 24 October, which was, however, Wednesday and not Monday.

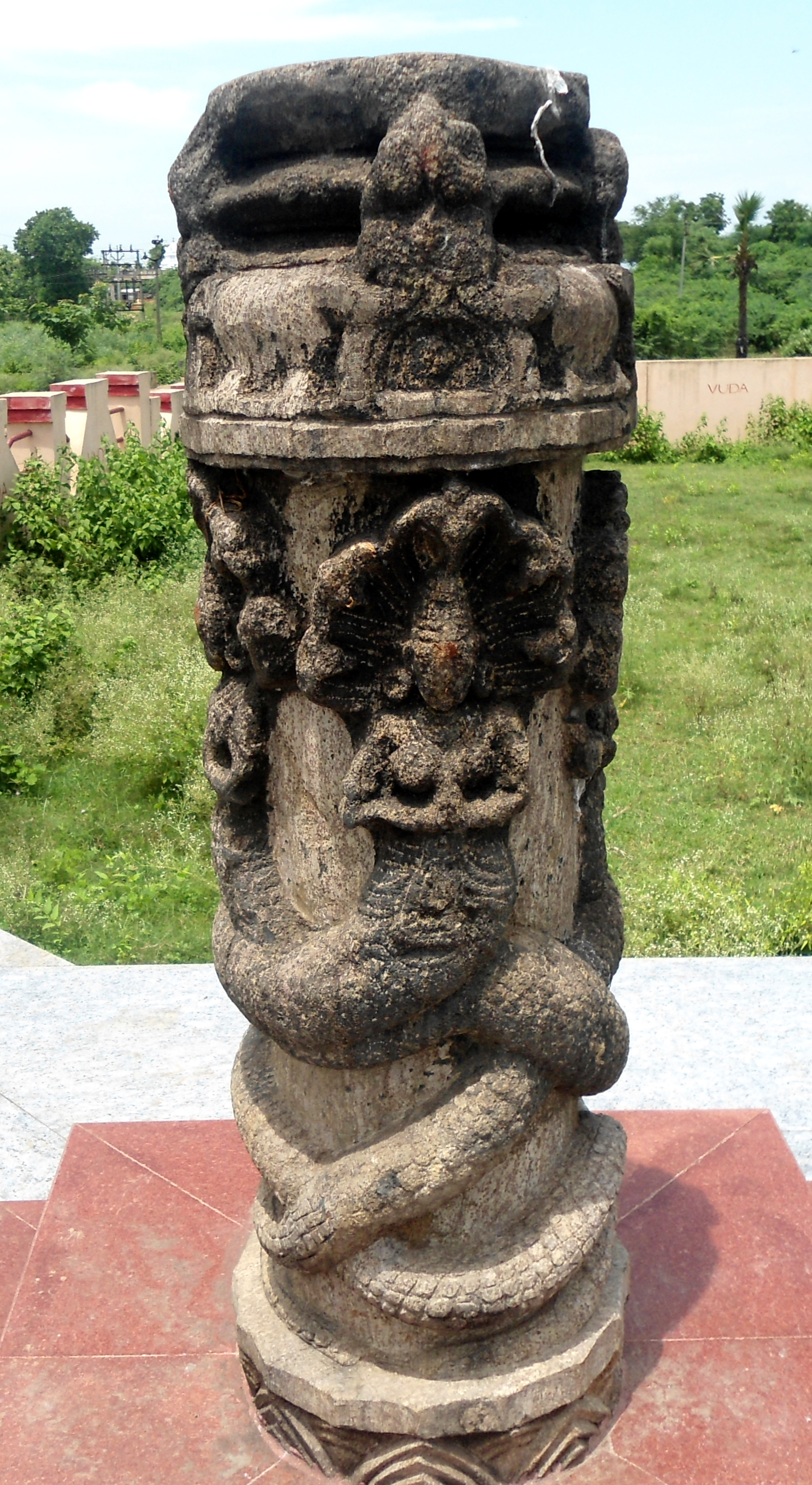
Sri Krishna Devaraya Vijayastambha (Victory Pillar) at Potnuru in Visakhapatnam District, Andhra Pradesh

It records a gift of the village Kunddal Kundu to the god Sri Ranga Raju of Pulivindla by Narasayya Deva Maharaju, brother of Basava Raju, son of Tamma Raju, grandson of Valla Bharaya and great-grandson of Bejawada Madhava Varma of Vasishtha-gotra and Surya-vamsa. The gift village is said to be situated in Pulivindalasthala, a subdivision of Mulkinadu in Gandhi Kotasima of Udayagiri Rajya.

- No. 52. (A.R. No. 18 of 1915.) Srisailam, Nandikotkur Taluk, Kurnool district. On stones built into the floor of the platform in the eastern porch of the Mallikarjuna temple. Krishnaraya, AD 1515. This is dated Saka 1438 (current), Yuva, Sravana su. 15, Wednesday, lunar eclipse, corresponding regularly to 25 July 1515.

The record is important for the historical information contained in it. The king, it is stated, started out from Vijayanagara on a campaign of conquest towards the east, conquered at a stretch Udayagiri, Addanki, Vinukonda, Bellamkonda, Nagarjunikonda, Tangedu, Ketavaram and other hill-forts and land-forts and captured Tirumala Kataraya Mahapatra. Having taken Kondavidu, he captured alive Virabhadra Raya, Nara Hari Deva, Rachuri Mallukhanu, Uddandakhanu, Jannala Kasavapatra, Pusapati Rachiraju, Srinatha Raju, Lakshmipati Raju, Paschima Balachandra Mahapatra and others. Later he reinstated the captives in their places, visited Amaresvara at Dharanikota and performed the Tulapurusha ceremony in the presence of the god on the banks of the river Krishnaveni. He had the Ratnadhenu and Sapta Sagara Mahadanas performed by his queens Chinna Devi and Tirumala Devi respectively. Finally he visited Sriparvata, where he had the mandapa built in the car street of the temple. The epigraph refers to the gift of the villages Paramanchala and Atukuru formerly made to the god of the place in the year Srimukha. It also mentions the remission of levies on loads (Kanchi-kavadi), pack-horses, bullocks, asses and head-loads.

The details of the date given for the said Srimukha viz., Vaisakha su. 11 and Thursday do not agree for the year. But they work out correctly for the previous year Bhava. Hence assuming the cyclic year to be a mistake for Bhava, the date would correspond to AD 1514, 4 May.

- No. 57. (A.R. No. 474 of 1919.) Little Kanchipuram, Kanchipuram Taluk, Chingleput District. On the north wall of the rock in the Arulala-perumal temple. Krishnaraya, 1517 AD. This is dated Saka 1438, Dhatri, Pushya ba. 7, Wednesday, corresponding to AD 1517, 14 January.

States that the king, having conquered Udayagiri, captured Ravutaraya-mahapatra, and having taken the hill fortresses of Addanki, Vinikonda, Bellamkonda, Tangeda, Ketavaram, etc., captured alive Vira Bhadra Raya, son of Pratapa Rudra Gajapati Raju. Narahari Deva, son of Kumara Hamvira and others, performed Tulapurusha at Amaresvara in Dharanikota, returned to Vijayanagara and started out again on a campaign of conquest towards Kalinga, reached Bejawada, conquered Kondapalli, captured Praha Raju Siras Chandra Mahapatra, Bodajana Mahapatra, Bujilikhanu and others, took at a stretch all the fortresses of Telangana such as Anantagiri, Udrakonda, Urlugonda, Aruvapalli, Jallipalli, Kandikonda, Kappaluvayi, Nalgonda, Kambhammettu, Kanakagiri, Samkkaragiri, etc., installed the jayastambha at Simhadri Potnuru and performed the mahadana there, returned to Rajamahendra and desiring to have the mahadanas performed by his queens Chinna Devi and Tirumala Devi, returned to Vijayanagara and having visited, on the above date, with his queens, god Varada Raju at Vishnu Kanchi, and paid one thousand varahas as kanika, had the punyakoti-vimana of the god gilded with gold and granted the villages Vershara, Tiruppalukadalu, Govindacheri, Nurappandangal and Peluru yielding altogether annually 1,500 varahas, to meet the expenses for the fort nightly pulukkappu service and daily offerings to the god.

- No. 73. (A.R. No. 353 of 1915.) Kundurru, Narasarowpet Taluk, Guntur district. On a Naga pillar lying in front of a deserted temple. Krishnaraya, AD 1522. This is dated Saka 1445 (current) Chitrabhanu, Vaisakha ba. 3. Monday, corresponding to AD 1522, 13 May (Tuesday).

The record is incomplete. It registers the grant of a piece of land in the village of Konudortta in Vinukondasima for offerings to god Purushottama of the village by Maha Mandalesvara Sarvayya Deva Chodaraju, son of Alamandala Yarayya Deva Chodaraju of Kasyapa-gotra. Vinikondasima is said to have been given to the donor as nayankara by Maha Pradhana Saluva Timmarasayya.

==== Sadasiva Raya ====
- No. 129. (A.R. No. 690 of 1917.) Kovelakuntla, Koilkuntla Taluk, Kurnool district. On a slab set up in front of the Ankalamma temple. Sadasiva Raya, 1543 AD. This is dated Saka 1465, Sobhakrit, Nija-Sravana ba. 10., corresponding to AD 1543, 25 August (Saturday).

It registers the grant of income derived from svamyatas in his nayankara territory of Kovila Kuntlasima for the Cherapu (Sirappu) and Paruventa festivals of the goddess Ahankal Amma by Maha Mandalesvara Nandyala Avubhalesvara Deva Maharaju, son of Singa Raju Deva Maharaju and the grandson of Narasingayya Deva Maharaju of the lunar race.

- No. 139. (A.R. No. 498 of 1906.) Mopuru, Pulivendla Taluk, Cuddapah District. On a slab set up in front of the central shrine of the Bhairavesvara temple. Sadasiva, AD 1545. This is dated Saka 1466, Krodhin, Magha su. 7, Rathasaptami, Monday, corresponding to AD 1545, 19 January, '50.

It records the remission of all taxes like Durga Vartana, Danayani Vartana, bedige, kanika and others in favour of the Vidvan mahajanas of the villages belonging to temples and to agraharas in Ghandikota Sakalisima obtained by the donor, Timmaya Deva Maharaju, son of Narasingaya Deva Maharaju and grandson of Maha Mandalesvara Nandyala Avubhala Deva Maharaju as Nayankara from the king. A similar remission of these taxes in the villages granted to the Bhai Ravesvara temple of Mopura is also recorded with the stipulation that the amount accrued was to be utilised for the daily worship and the rathosvava of the god.

- No. 167. (A.R. No. 377 of 1926.) Tangeda, Palnadu Taluk, Guntur district. On a slab set up in front of the deserted temple of Sita Rama Svamin in the fort. Sadasiva, AD 1548. This is dated Saka 1470, Kilaka, vaisakha su. 15, Sunday, lunar eclipse corresponding to AD 1548, 22 April.

It registers the grant of the village Kachavaram in Tangedasima to the god Lakshmi Narasimha at Tangeda by Deva Chodaraju, son of Mummaya Deva Chodaraju and the grandson of Maha Mandalesvara Apratika Malla Kurucheti Somaya Deva Chodaraju of the solar race and belonging to the Kasyapa-gotra, apastamba-sutra and Yajus-sakha at the command of Rama Raja Vithalaya Deva Maharaju who is said to have conferred the Tangedasima as nayankara the donor.

- No. 175. (A.R. No. 369 of 1920.) Chitrachedu, Gooty Taluk, Anantapur district. On a slab in the compound of the mosque. Sadasiva, AD 1550. This is dated Saka 1473 (current), Sadharana, Ashadha su. 10 corresponding to AD 1550, 23 June, (Monday).

This fragmentary record mentions the pontiff Santa Bhiksha Vritti Ayyavaru and his three spiritual sons, the Narapati, Asvapati and Gajapati kings who seem to have made some gifts to god Mallikarjuna of Srisaila worshipped by them.

- No. 191. (A.R. No. 584 of 1909.) Macherla, Palnadu Taluk, Guntur District. On a slab set up in the courtyard of the Virabhadresvara temple. Sadasiva, AD 1554. The record is dated in Chronogram 'rasa-saila-veda..’ and the numerals 76, Ananda, Ashadha, su. 15, Friday, lunar eclipse. The word for the numeral 1 is apparently lost. The details of the date correspond to AD 1554, 15 June 1551, if the month was Adhika Ashadha.

The inscription which is damaged, records a grant of 14 putti and 10 tumu of land constituting it into a village by name Lingapuram, by Ling Amma, wife of Veligoti Komara Timma Nayaka to the gods Ishta Kamesvara and Viresvara of Macherla situated to the north of Macherla and west of the Chandra Bhaga river, in Nagarjuna-konda-sima which Komara Timma Nayaka is said to have obtained as nayankara from Maha Mandalesvara Rama Raju Thirumalaraju Deva Maharaju.

- No. 201. (A.R. No. 161 of 1905.) Markapur, Markapur Taluk, Kurnool District. On the east wall, left of entrance, of the antarala-mandapa in the Chenna-kesava-svamin temple. Sadasiva, AD 1555.

This is dated Saka 1476, Ananda, Magha su. 7, corresponding to AD 1555, 29 January.

It records a gift of the various toll incomes due from the 18 villages, viz., Marakarapuram, Channavaram, Konddapuram, Yachavaram, Rayavaram, Gonguladinna, Tarnumbadu, Surepalli, Vanalapuram, Chanareddipalle, Gangireddipalle, Korevanipalle, Medisettipalle, Gollapalle, Jammuladinna, Tellambadu, Kamalpuram and Kondapalli to god Chennakesava by Maha Mandalesvara Madiraju Narappadeva Maharaju, son of Aubhalayya Deva Maharaju, grandson of Maha Mandalesvara Madiraju Singa Raju Deva Maharaju, of Kasyapa-gotra and Surya-vamsa, and nephew of Maha Mandalesvara Rama Raju Thirumalaraju. The gift villages are said to be situated in Kochcherla Kotasima which was held by the donor as Nayankara from the king. Records in addition that the lanjasunkham (levy on prostitutes) collected during the festivals at Marakapuram was also made over to the temple and that five out of every six dishes of offerings to the deity, were to be made over to the satra (feeding house) for feeding paradesi Brahmanas of the smartha sect, the sixth dish being the share of the sthanikas, the adhikaris and the karanas.

- No. 205. (A.R. No. 59 of 1915.) Chinna Ahobalam, Sirvel Taluk, Kurnool District. On the west wall of the Narasimha-svamin shrine in the Narasimha-svamin temple. Sadasiva, AD 1555. This is dated Saka 1478 (current), Rakshasa, Sravana ba. 7 corresponding to 9 August 1555,(Friday).

The record is damaged and fragmentary. It seems to register a gift (of land) to god Ahobala Narasimha by Ganapatiraju who belonged to the Kasyapa-gotra Apastamba-sutra and Yajus-sakha and was the son of Nandi Raju and the grandson of Maha Mandalesvara Krishna Raju of the solar race.

- No. 228. (A.R. No. 411 of 1911.) Vontimitta, Sidhavatam Taluk, Cuddapah District. On a slab set up near the eastern gopura of the Kodanda Rama Swamy temple. Sadasiva, AD 1558. This is dated Saka 1480, Kalayukt, and Ashadha su. 12, Monday, corresponding to 27 June 1558.

The inscription records a gift of the village Vontimetta with its hamlets in Sidhavatam-sima of Udayagiri Rajya to god Raghu Nayaka of the same village said to have been consecrated by Jambavanta, by Naga Raja Deva Maharaju of Kasyapa-gotra, and Surya-Vamsa and the son-in-law of Rama Raju and Gutti Yara Thirumalaraju Deva Maharaju of Kasyapa-gotra, and Surya-Vamsa and the sons of Sri Ranga Raju and the grandsons of Aravidu Rama Raju of Atreya-gotra and Soma-Vamsa. The gift village was situated in Siddhavatamsima which the donor appears to have held as his nayankara

- No. 234. (A.R. No. 394 of 1920.) Guntakallu, Gooty Taluk, Anantapur district. On a stone set up in front of the Krishnasvamin temple. Sadasiva, AD 1558. This is dated Saka 14[80], Kalayukti, Kartika su. 12, corresponding to 24 October 1558.

It records a gift of land to the mannevaru, melavaru, Naga svaralavaru and uyyala sevavaru for services in the temple of Kesava Perumal in Guntakallu in Guttisima by Maha-Mandalesvara Madiraju Vallabhai. Guttisima is said to have been held by the donor as nayankara from Maha-mandalesvara Rama Raju Tirumalaraju Deva-Maharaju

- No. 235. (A.R. No. 79 of 1915.) Pedda Ahobalam, Sirvel Taluk, Kurnool District. On a slab set up near the sixteen-pillared mandapa on the way to upper Ahobalam. Sadasiva, AD 1558. This is dated Saka 14[80], Kalayukt, Margasirsha su. 3, corresponding to 13 November 1558, (Sunday).

It records the grant of a piece of land and some money by Emberumanar-Jiyyamgaru, the mudrakarta of Vam Sathagopa-Jiyyamgaru and others for conducting certain festivals when god Ahobalesvara was seated in the 16 pillared mandapa constructed by Maha-mandalesvara Kurucheti Timmaraju, son of Vobul Raju and grandson of Baichana Deva Chodaraju of the solar race, when the god was taken (in procession) to Diguva Tirupati and back to the temple (nagaru)

- No. 240. (A.R. No. 311 of 1922.) Vyapulapalle, Hamlet of Mudivedu, Madanapalle Taluk, Chittoor District. On a rock in the village. Sadasiva, AD 1559. This is dated Saka 1481, Siddharthin, Sravana ba. 12 Friday corresponding to 31 July 1559. The weekday, however, was Monday.

It registers a gift of wet and dry lands to god Lakshmi Narasimha at Ramagiridurga by Jillela Vengalayya-Deva-Maharaju, son of Krishnam Raju and grandson of Peda Krishnam Raju of Kasyapa-gotra, Apastamba-sutra and Yajus-sakha. The gift lands are stated to be situated in Vempalapalli in the village of Mudivada in Vailipatisima belonging to Rama-giri-durga of Penugonda Marjavada which the donor is said to have obtained as amara from Rama Raju Tirumalaraju Deva Maharaju.

- No. 251. (A.R. No. 15 of 1904.) Hampi, Hospet Taluk, Bellary District. On the north wall of the mandapa in front of the deserted shrine to the west of the Vitthalasvamin temple. Sadasiva, 1561 AD. This is dated Saka 1483, Raudri (current), Phalguna, the other details being lost.

It registers an agreement (kaulu) granted by Kurucheti Sri Ranga Raju, son of Obulraju of the solar race and Kasyapa-gotra to a person (name lost) for his having level-led and brought under cultivation a specified piece of land stipulating an annual payment of one ghatti varaha by him into the treasury of god Vitthalesvara and a fourth share of the produce to the donor. The details pertaining to the rest of the produce are lost. Refers to a gift of garden land made to (the shrine of) Tirumangai-Alvar on the occasion of Prathama-ekadasi.

- No. 269. (A.R. No. 166 of 1905.) Markapur, Markapur Taluk, Kurnool District. On a pillar of the garuda-mandapa in the Chennkesavasvamin temple. Sadasiva, 1569 AD. This is dated Saka 1491, Sukla, Ashadha su. 12 corresponding to 25 June 1569

The record is partly built in. It registers a gift of the income out of the akula mantrayam to the god by Chennapa-nayaka, son of Komara Timma-nayaka and grandson of Veligoti Peda Timma Nayaka of Recherla-gotra. The donor is said to have obtained Kochcherla kotasima as nayankara from Maha Mandalesvara Rama Raju Thirumalaraju.

==== Ranga Raya ====
- 97 (No. 201 of 1967) Chidipiralla (Kamalapuram Taluk) On a stone near the Anjaneya temple. S. 1501; Bhadhanya, (AD 1578)

It records the digging of irrigation canals at Chadupurella as the old ones became out of use, by Mahamandal-eswara Katta Mama Singa Raya Deva Choda Maharaja, who is said to be holding the Nayamkara of Chadupurala n the Ghandikota sima (as a subordinate chief) under his son-in-law Mahamandal-eswara Nandyala Narashim-ayya Deva Maharaja.

- 131 (No. 2 of 1968) ANnaluru (Proddutur Taluk) On a slab in front of the Chennakesava temple. Araviti(?)

It registers the grant of the village Annaluru to the God Allimenu Mamgga Tiruvemggalanatha-Deva by Bukka Raju Tirumalaraju.

- 169 (No. 227 of 1968) Gurijala (Pulivendala Taluk) On a slab near the temple of Ganesh. Maha Mandalesvara Tirumalaraja. Paridhavi

The record refers to a lease deed of some land executed by some Rama Raju of Mahamandela-eswara Tirumalaraju, in favour of probably some cultivators of Gurizala, the levy or tax being at the rate of 2 rukas. Details not clear.

==== Venkatapati Raya ====
- 244 Siddhavatam (Siddhavatam Taluk) On the east wall near the entrance of the old fort. Saka 1527; Visvasu

The inscriptions refers itself to the reign of Venkatapati Raya and enumerates the achievements of the Matli Chiefs Ellama Raju and his son Ananta Raju. The latter is stated to have built the radiant and extensive stone wall at Siddhavatam which his father had acquired in the battle of Utukuru. In the Telugu portion, which is a stsamalika, it is stated that while Vira Venkata Raya was ruling the empire from Chandragiri-sima, Anata Raju constructed the tank, Ananta Raju-cheruvu at Siddhavatam which his father had acquired at the point of his sword after defeating Konda Raju Tirupati Raju in battle and built a wall around the town so that it might protect the temple of Siddhavatesvara. His is also said to be the author of Kakutstha-vijayamu and of the Kavyas. (Published in Epigraphia Indica xxxxvii. pp. 103–112, by Dr. N. Venkata Ramanayya)

=== Moghul ===
No. 776. (A. R. No. 56 of 1912.) On a pillar in the temple of Kesavasvami at Chodavaram, Viravalli Taluk, Vizagapatam District. S. 1658. (Akshaya)

Incomplete. Says that Pusapati Vijaya Rama Raju, son of Sita Rama Raju was ruling the land and mentions the god Kesavasvami and the village Chodavaram.

== See also ==
- Early Indian epigraphy
- Kakatiya Dynasty
- Reddi Kingdom
- Reddy
- Rajus
