= Archaeometallurgy =

Study of the past use and production of metals

Archaeometallurgy is the study of the past use and production of metals by humans. It is a sub-discipline of archaeology and archaeological science that examines the relationship between human societies and metallurgical technologies throughout history.

The field encompasses several specializations, including metallography of finished objects, mineralogy of waste products such as slag, and manufacturing studies. Through chemical and anthropological analysis, archaeometallurgy provides valuable insights into archaeological questions ranging from technological choices to social organization, contributing to our understanding of how ancient societies extracted, processed, and utilized metals.

== Methods ==
There are various methodological approaches to archaeometallurgical studies. The same methods used in analytical chemistry may be used to analyze artifacts. Chemical analysis methods may include the analysis of mass, density or chemical composition. Most methods are non-destructive in nature, such as X-ray spectroscopy, or micro-destructive (requiring removal of only a tiny portion of the sample). Non-destructive methods can be used on more artefacts than destructive ones, but because they operate at the surface of the metal, corrosion and other surface effects may interfere with the results. Options that include sampling include various forms of mass spectrometry and a variety of chemical tests.

=== Modern to ancient ===
One of the methods of archaeometallurgy is the study of modern metals and alloys to explain and understand the use of metals in the past. A study conducted by the department of Particle Physics and Astrophysics at Weizmann Institute of Science and the department of Archaeology at the University of Haifa analyzed the chemical composition and the mass of different denominations of Euro coinage. They concluded that even with modern standards and technology, there is a considerable variation within the "same" denomination of coin. This simple conclusion can be used to further analyze discoveries of ancient currency.

== Non-ferrous archaeometallurgy ==
The specific study of the non-ferrous metals used in past. Gold, silver and copper were the first to be used by ancient humans. Gold and copper are both found in their 'native' state in nature, and were thus the first to be exploited as they did not need to be smelted from their ores. They could be hammered into sheets or decorative shapes. The extraction of copper from its ores may have developed due to the attractive colouring and value of ores such as malachite.

== Ferrous archaeometallurgy ==
The specific study of the ferrous compounds (those including iron, Fe) used in the past. Iron metal was first encountered in meteorites, and was later extracted from iron ores to create wrought iron which was never fully molten, and later, cast iron. Iron combined with carbon formed steel, allowing people to develop superior tools and weapons from the Iron Age to the Industrial Revolution.

== History ==
Early pioneers laid important groundwork for archaeometallurgy through field excavations and artifact documentation. Father Daniel Finn conducted systematic archaeological investigations on Lamma Island, Hong Kong from 1927-1936, recovering and documenting numerous bronze artifacts including axes, vessels, and weapons, establishing one of the first comprehensive records of Bronze Age metallurgy in South China.

After initial sporadic work, archaeometallurgy was more widely institutionalised globally during the 1960s and 70s. Research groups emerged in Britain (The British Museum, the UCL Institute for Archeo-Metallurgical Studies), Germany (Deutsches Bergbau Museum), the US (MIT and Harvard), and China, where the Archaeometallurgy Group of the Beijing University of Iron and Steel Technology (BUIST) was established in 1974. Chinese researchers beganto apply modern techniques extensively in the late 1970s. The growing international nature of the field was formalized in 1981 when Professors Tsun Ko (Ke Jun) and Bob Maddin established the international conference series "Beginnings of the Use of Metals and Alloys".

Since 2000, the field has experienced rapid growth, particularly in China, with over 300 research papers on ancient Chinese metallurgy published in the first 15 years of the 21st century. This period has seen the emergence of a new generation of scholars, many trained in the West, and increased international collaboration through symposiums beyond the BUMA conferences.

== See also ==
- Ancient iron production
- Cupellation
- Liquation
- Roman metallurgy
- Metallurgy during the Copper Age in Europe
- Metallurgy in Pre-Columbian America
- History of ferrous metallurgy
- Native copper
- Tin sources and trade in ancient times
- Experimental Archaeometallurgy
- Nonferrous Archaeometallurgy in the Southern Levant
- Metallurgy
