= Archaeometallurgical slag =

Artefact of ancient iron production

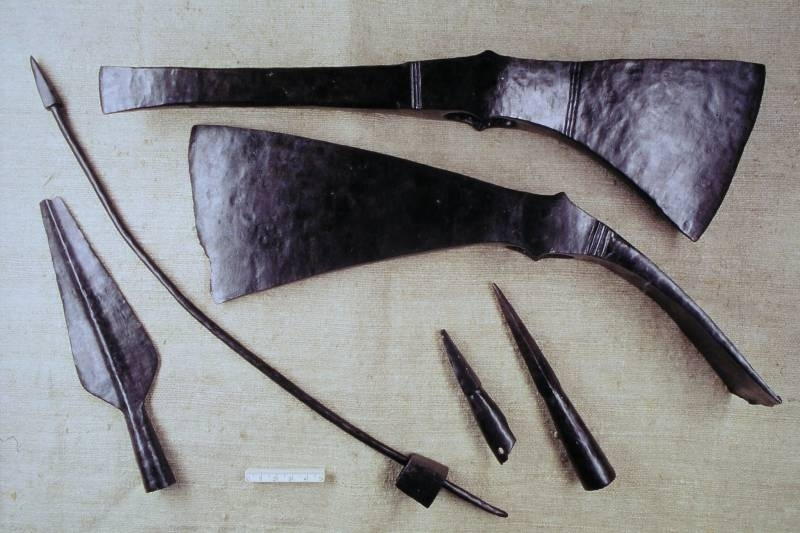

Archaeometallurgical slag is slag discovered and studied in the context of archaeology. Slag, the byproduct of iron-working processes such as smelting or smithing, is left at the iron-working site rather than being moved away with the product. As it weathers well, it is readily available for study. The size, shape, chemical composition and microstructure of slag are determined by features of the iron-working processes used at the time of its formation.

== Overview ==
The ores used in ancient smelting processes were rarely pure metal compounds. Impurities were removed from the ore through the process of slagging, which involves adding heat and chemicals. Slag is the material in which the impurities from ores (known as gangue), as well as furnace lining and charcoal ash, collect. The study of slag can reveal information about the smelting process used at the time of its formation.

The finding of slag is direct evidence of smelting having occurred in that place, as slag was not removed from the smelting site. Through slag analysis, archaeologists can reconstruct ancient human activities concerned with metal work such as its organization and specialization.

The contemporary knowledge of slagging gives insights into ancient iron production. In a smelting furnace, up to four different phases might co-exist. From the top of the furnace to the bottom, the phases are slag, matte, speiss, and liquid metal.

Slag can be classified as furnace slag, tapping slag or crucible slag depending on the mechanism of production. The slag has three functions. The first is to protect the melt from contamination. The second is to accept unwanted liquid and solid impurities. Finally, slag can help to control the supply of refining media to the melt.

These functions are achieved if the slag has a low melting temperature, low density and high viscosity which ensure a liquid slag that separates well from the melting metal. Slag should also maintain its correct composition so that it can collect more impurities and be immiscible in the melt.

Through chemical and mineralogical analysis of slag, factors such as the identity of the smelted metal, the types of ore used and technical parameters such as working temperature, gas atmosphere and slag viscosity can be learned.

== Slag formation ==
Natural iron ores are mixtures of iron and unwanted impurities, or gangue. In ancient times, these impurities were removed by slagging. Slag was removed by liquation, that is, solid gangue was converted into a liquid slag. The temperature of the process was high enough for the slag to exist in its liquid form.

Smelting was conducted in various types of furnaces. Examples are the bloomery furnace and the blast furnace. The condition in the furnace determines the morphology, chemical composition and the microstructure of the slag.

The bloomery furnace produced iron in a solid state. This is because the bloomery process was conducted at a temperature lower than the melting point of iron metal. Carbon monoxide from the incomplete combustion of charcoal slowly diffused through the hot iron oxide ore, converting it to iron metal and carbon dioxide.

Blast furnaces were used to produce liquid iron. The blast furnace was operated at higher temperatures and at a greater reducing condition than the bloomery furnace. A greater reducing environment was achieved by increasing the fuel to ore ratio. More carbon reacted with the ore and produced a cast iron rather than solid iron. Also, the slag produced was less rich in iron.

A different process was used to make "tapped" slag. Here, only charcoal was added to the furnace. It reacted with oxygen, and generated carbon monoxide, which reduced the iron ore to iron metal. The liquefied slag separated from the ore, and was removed through the tapping arch of the furnace wall.

In addition, the flux (purifying agent), the charcoal ash and the furnace lining contributed to the composition of the slag.

Slag may also form during smithing and refining. The product of the bloomery process is heterogeneous blooms of entrapped slag. Smithing is necessary to cut up and remove the trapped slag by reheating, softening the slag and then squeezing it out. On the other hand, refining is needed for the cast iron produced in the blast furnace. By re-melting the cast iron in an open hearth, the carbon is oxidized and removed from the iron. Liquid slag is formed and removed in this process.

== Slag analysis ==
The analysis of slag is based on its shape, texture, isotopic signature, chemical and mineralogical characteristics. Analytical tools like Optical Microscope, scanning electron microscope (SEM), X-ray Fluorescence (XRF), X-ray diffraction (XRD) and inductively coupled plasma-mass spectrometry (ICP-MS) are widely employed in the study of slag.

=== Macro-analysis ===
The first step in the investigation of archaeometallurgical slag is the identification and macro-analysis of slag in the field. Physical properties of slag such as shape, colour, porosity and even smell are used to make a primary classification to ensure representative samples from slag heaps are obtained for future micro-analysis.

For example, tap slag usually has a wrinkled upper face and a flat lower face due to contact with soil.

Furthermore, the macro-analysis of slag heaps can prove an estimated total weight which in turn can be used to determine the scale of production at a particular smelting location.

=== Bulk chemical analysis ===
The chemical composition of slag can reveal much about the smelting process. XRF is the most commonly used tool in analysing the chemical composition of slag. Through chemical analysis, the composition of the charge, the firing temperature, the gas atmosphere and the reaction kinetics can be determined.

Ancient slag composition is usually a quaternary eutectic system CaO-SiO_{2}-FeO-Al_{2}O_{3} simplified to CaO-SiO_{2}-FeO_{2}, giving a low and uniform melting point. In some circumstances, the eutectic system was created according to the proportion of silicates to metal oxides in the gangue, together with the type of ore and the furnace lining. In other instances, a flux was required to achieve the correct system.

The melting temperature of slag can be determined by plotting its chemical composition in a ternary plot.

The viscosity of slag can be calculated through its chemical composition with equation:

$$K_{v} = \frac{CaO + MgO + FeO + MnO + AlK_{2}O}{Si_{2}O_{3} + Al_{2}O_{3} } \,$$

where $K_{v}$ is the index of viscosity.

With recent advances in rotational viscometry techniques, viscosities of iron oxide slags are also widely undertaken. Coupled with phase equilibria studies, these analysis provide a better understanding of physico-chemical behaviour of slags at high temperatures.

In the early stages of smelting, the separation between melting metal and slag is not complete. Hence, the main, minor and trace elements of metal in the slag can be indicators of the type of ore used in the smelting process.

=== Mineralogical analysis ===
The optical microscope, scanning electron microscope, X-ray diffraction and petrographic analysis can be used to determine the types and distribution of minerals in slag. The minerals present in the slag are good indicators of the gas atmosphere in the furnace, the cooling rate of the slag and the homogeneity of the slag. The type of ore and flux used in the smelting process can be determined if there are elements of un-decomposed charge or even metal pills trapped in the slag.

Slag minerals are classified as silicates, oxides and sulfides. Bachmann classified the main silicates in slag according to the ratio between metal oxides and silica.

Ratio MeO : SiO_{2} silicate examples

2 : 1 fayalite
2 : 1 monticellite
1.5 : 1 melilite
1 : 1 pyroxene

Fayalite (Fe_{2}SiO_{4}) is the most common mineral found in ancient slag. By studying the shape of the fayalite, the cooling rates of the slag can be roughly estimated.

Fayalite reacts with oxygen to form magnetite:

3Fe_{2}SiO_{4} + O_{2}= 2FeO·Fe_{2}O_{3} + 3SiO_{2}

Therefore, the gas atmosphere in the furnace can be calculated from the ratio of magnetite to fayalite in the slag.

The presence of metal sulfides suggests that a sulfidic ore has been used. Metal sulfides survive the oxidizing stage before smelting and therefore may also indicate a multi-stage smelting process.

When fayalite is replete with CaO, monticellite and pyroxene form. They are an indicator of a high calcium content in the ore.

=== Lead isotope analysis ===
Lead isotope analysis is a technique for determining the source of ore in ancient smelting. Lead isotope composition is a signature of ore deposits and varies very little throughout the whole deposit. Also, lead isotope composition is unchanged in the smelting process.

The amount of each of the four stable isotopes of lead are used in the analysis. They are ^{204}Pb, ^{206}Pb, ^{207}Pb and ^{208}Pb. Ratios: ^{208}Pb/^{207}Pb, ^{207}Pb/^{206}Pb and ^{206}Pb/^{204}Pb are measured by mass spectrometry. Apart from ^{204}Pb, the lead isotopes are all products of the radioactive decay of uranium and thorium. When ore is deposited, uranium and thorium are separated from the ore. Thus, deposits formed in different geological periods will have different lead isotope signatures.

^{238}U →^{206}Pb
^{235}U →^{207}Pb
^{232}Th→^{208}Pb

For example, Hauptmann performed lead isotope analysis on slags from Faynan, Jordan. The resulting signature was the same as that from ores from the dolomite, limestone and shale deposits in the Wadi Khalid and Wadi Dana areas of Jordan.

=== Physical dating ===
Ancient slag is difficult to date. It has no organic material with which to perform radiocarbon dating. There are no cultural artifacts like pottery shards in the slag with which to date it. Direct physical dating of slag through thermoluminescence dating could be a good method to solve this problem. Thermoluminescence dating is possible if the slag contains crystal elements such as quartz or feldspar. However, the complex composition of slag can make this technique difficult unless the crystal elements can be isolated.

== See also ==
- Archaeometallurgy
- Bog iron
- Iron metallurgy in Africa
- Iron Age
