= Northern Levant =

Region in the Eastern Mediterranean

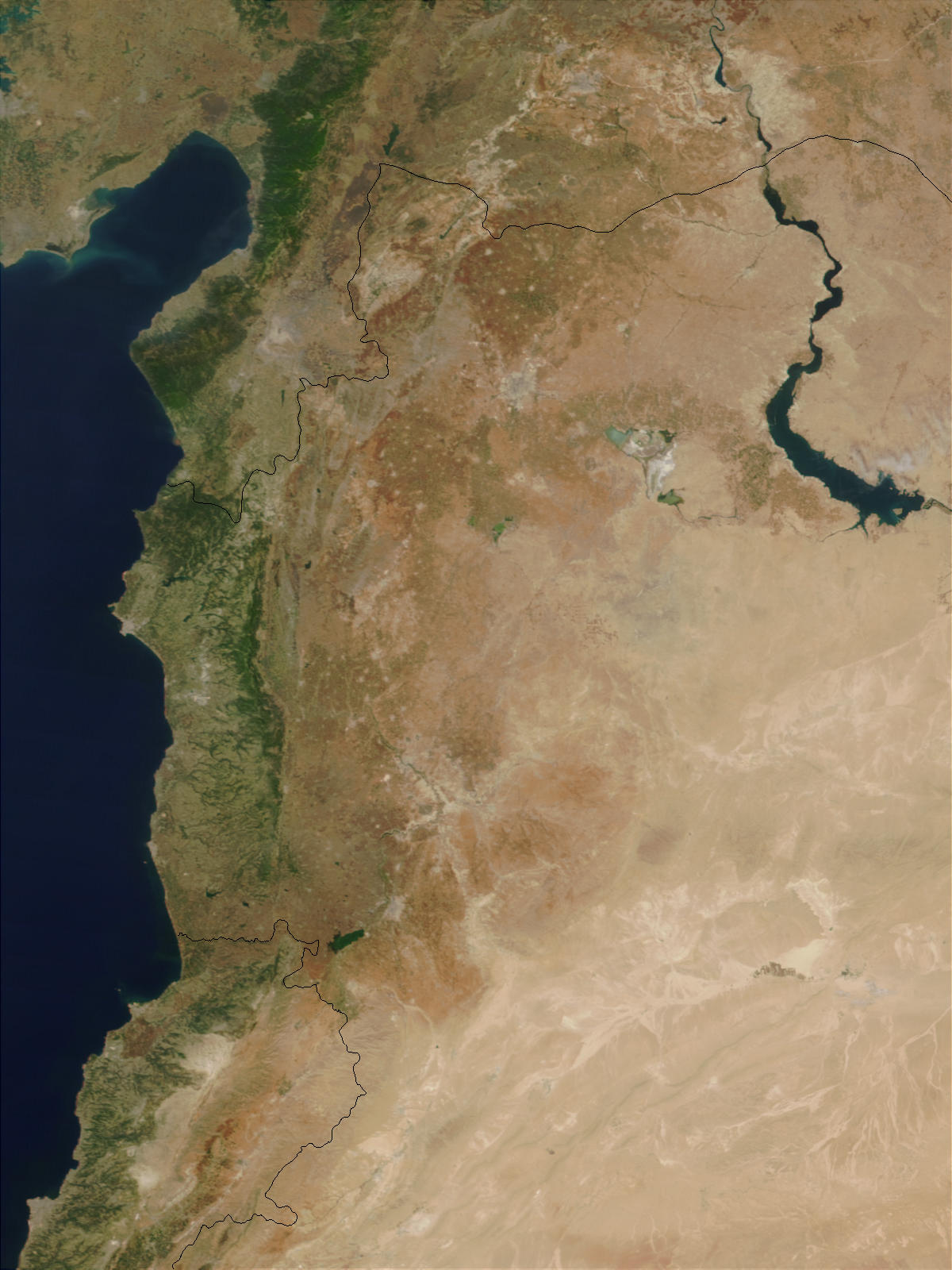
Satellite imagery of the Northern Levant

The Northern Levant is a geographical region in the Eastern Mediterranean, encompassing the northern part of the Levant, between the Mediterranean in the west and the eastern deserts, going south as far as Lebanon's Litani River. It corresponds approximately to the modern-day southern Turkish coastal province of Hatay, Syria excluding the desert northeast of the Euphrates, and Lebanon except for its southern part. A defining feature is the northern section of the Syro-African Rift starting at the Marash triple junction.

== Boundaries ==
In archaeology, the Northern Levant can be defined as the northern section of what in Arabic is called "bilād al-shām, 'the land of sham [Syria]'", in other terms, the northern part of greater Syria (not to be confused with modern-day Syria). The Oxford Handbook of the Archaeology of the Levant: c. 8000–332 BCE (OHAL; 2013) defines its boundaries, for the specific purposes of the book, as follows.

- To the north: the Taurus Mountains or the Plain of 'Amuq
- To the east: the eastern deserts, i.e. (from north to south) the Euphrates and the Jebel el-Bishrī area, followed by the Syrian Desert, also known as the Badia region, east of the eastern hinterland of the Anti-Lebanon Mountains (whose southernmost part is Mount Hermon) - in other words, it borders Mesopotamia and the north Arabian Desert.
- To the south: the Litani River, which marks the boundary towards the Southern Levant.
- To the west: the Mediterranean Sea

== See also ==
- History of Syria
- History of Lebanon
  - Archaeology of Lebanon
- North Levantine Arabic
- Southern Levant

== Bibliography ==
- Steiner, Margreet L.; Killebrew, Ann E., eds. (2013). The Oxford Handbook of the Archaeology of the Levant: c. 8000-332 BCE. OUP Oxford. pp. 2, 9–10. doi:10.1093/oxfordhb/9780199212972.001.0001. ISBN 9780199212972.
