= Southern Levant =

Geographical region

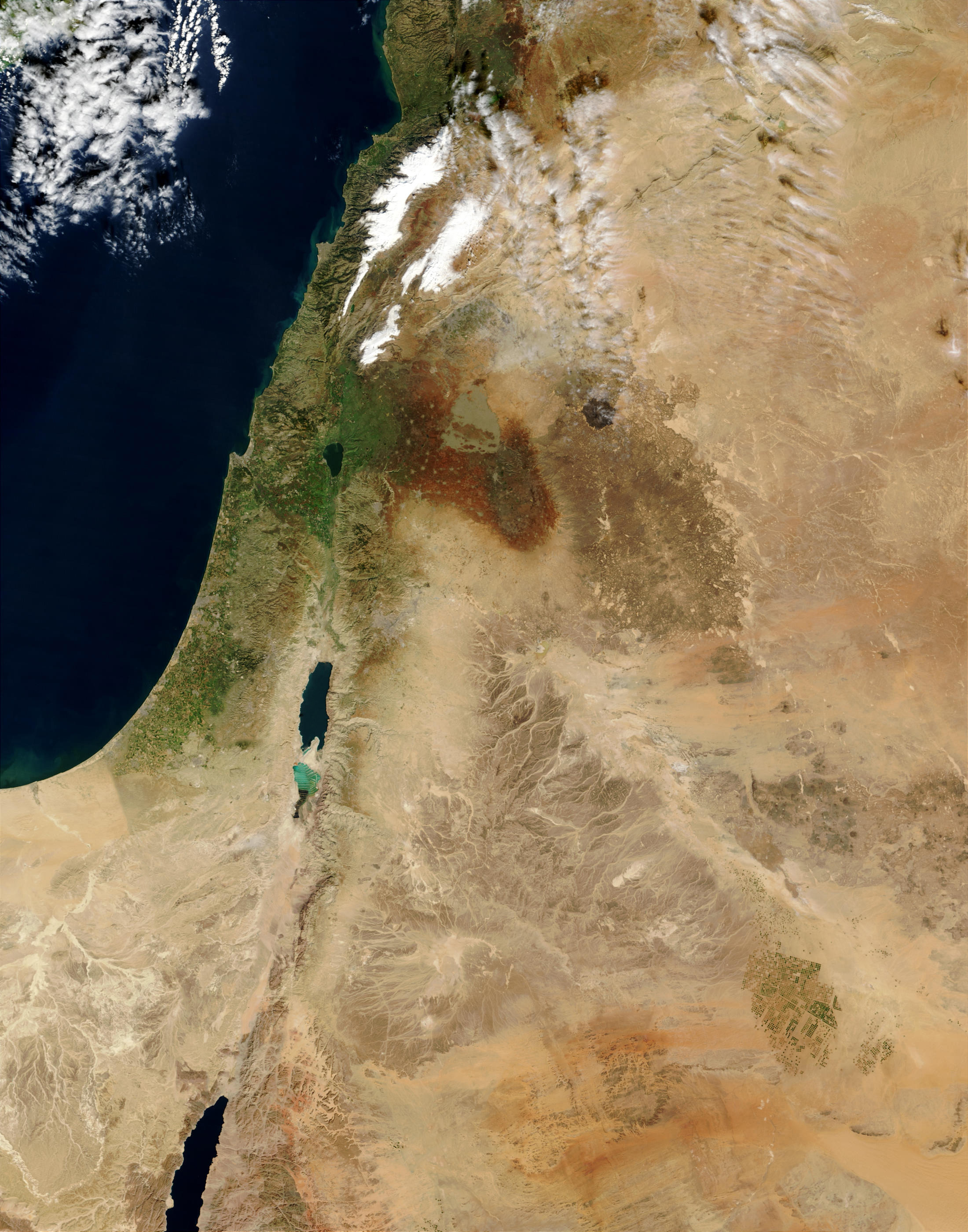
Satellite imagery of the Southern Levant, with visible geographical features including, from west to east, the Mediterranean Sea, the Jordan Valley, Hauran, and the Badia, or the Syrian desert

The Southern Levant is a geographical region in West Asia along the eastern coast of the Mediterranean Sea, a territory corresponding approximately to present-day Israel, Palestine, and Jordan; some definitions also include southern Lebanon, southern Syria, and the Sinai Peninsula. As a strictly geographical description, it is sometimes used by archaeologists and historians to avoid the religious and political connotations of other names for this area.

Like much of Southwestern Asia, the Southern Levant is an arid region consisting mostly of desert and dry steppe, with a thin strip of wetter, temperate climate along the Mediterranean coast. Geographically it is dominated by the Jordan Valley, a section of the Great Rift Valley bisecting the region from north to south, and containing the Sea of Galilee, the Jordan River and the Dead Sea—the lowest point on the Earth's land surface. The Litani River in southern Lebanon is commonly considered the dividing line between the Southern Levant and the Northern Levant.

The Southern Levant has a long history and is one of the world's most intensively investigated areas by archaeologists. It is considered likely to be the first place that both early hominins and modern humans colonized outside of Africa. Consequently, it has a rich Stone Age archaeology, stretching back as early as 1.5 million years ago. With one of the earliest sites for urban settlements, it also corresponds to the western parts of the Fertile Crescent.

== Terminology ==
Maps showing the extent of the Southern Levant based on geographic features (left) or modern political boundaries (right). Definitions vary between scholars:
Core area of the Southern Levant (Israel, Palestine & Jordan)
Other regions sometimes included in the Southern Levant (Southern Lebanon, Southern Syria, the Sinai Peninsula & the Badia)

The Southern Levant refers to the lower half of the Levant but there is some variance of geographical definition, with the widest definition including Israel, Palestine, Jordan, Lebanon, southern Syria, and the Sinai Desert. In the field of archaeology, the southern Levant is "the region formerly identified as Syria-Palestine and including Canaan."

Many scholars studying the region's archaeology have adopted the term Levant (including northern and southern halves) as the "term of choice" due to it being a "wider, yet relevant, cultural corpus" that does not have the "political overtones" of Syria-Palestine. A survey of North American dissertations shows the "overwhelming emphasis and scope of these works has been the southern Levant, an area formerly identified as Syria-Palestine including Canaan", but with most modern Ph.D. dissertations using the terms 'Israel' and 'Canaan'.

The term "Southern Levant" has also been criticized as imprecise and awkward. The term Southern Levant has been described in academic discourse as a "at least a strictly geographical" description of the region, avoiding religious and political connotations of names such as "Canaan", "Holy Land", "Land of Israel", or "Palestine".

== Geography ==
Topographic map of the Southern Levant

The Southern Levant lies on the eastern coast of the Mediterranean Sea, in the world region known variously as the Near East, the Middle East or Western or Southwestern Asia. It is bordered to the east, southeast and southwest by the Syrian, Arabian and Sinai deserts, respectively. Some definitions include parts of these deserts in the region. The Litani River in southern Lebanon is commonly considered the dividing line between the Southern Levant and the Northern Levant (i.e. Syria), or sometimes the Orontes River, also in Lebanon.

For the most part, the climate of the Southern Levant is arid or semi-arid, however a narrow strip along the coast experiences a temperate, Mediterranean climate due to its proximity to the sea. Average annual rainfall decreases sharply away from the coast, from over 1,000 millimetres (39 inches) per year in Galilee, to 200–400 millimetres (7.9–15.7 inches) in the Rift Valley, and less than 50 millimetres (2.0 inches) in the eastern deserts and the Negev. Across the region, precipitation is both highly seasonal―most rain falls between October and May, and hardly any in the summer—and subject to large, unpredictable inter-annual variation. Temperature is also highly variable, with cool winters and hot summers.

The Jordan River bisects much of the region into the Cisjordan and Transjordan. The Huleh basin feeds into the upper Jordan, which moves southward through a natural basalt barrier into the Sea of Galilee before dropping several hundred metres as it flows through the Jordan Valley. The Jordan River terminates at the Dead Sea, whose banks, at 400 metres (1,300 feet) below sea level, are the world's lowest point on dry land.

== Archaeological findings ==
The archaeology of the southern Levant is generally conceived as a series of phases or stages in human cultural and evolutionary development based, for the most part, on tool technology for early pre-historic, proto-historic and early historic periods. Later phases are generally associated with historical periods and are named accordingly. While there is no single, accepted sequence that all archaeologists agree upon, the basic conventions indicate a number of Stone Ages, followed by a Copper/Stone Age, in turn followed by a Bronze Age. The names given to them, derived from the Greek, are also used widely for other regions. The different ages in turn are often divided up into sequential or sometimes parallel chrono-cultural facies, sometimes called "cultures" or "periods". Sometimes their names are derived from European prehistory, at other times from local sites, often where they were first discovered.

Archaeologically, it is among the most extensively excavated regions in the world.

=== Pre-history and Stone Age ===
The Southern Levant is amongst the oldest inhabited parts of Eurasia, being on one of three plausible routes by which early hominins could have dispersed out of Africa (along with the Bab al Mandab and the Strait of Gibraltar). Homo erectus left Africa and became the first hominin species to colonise Europe and Asia approximately two million years ago, probably through the Southern Levant. During this phase of the Pleistocene epoch the region was wetter and greener, allowing H. erectus to find places with fresh water as it followed other African animals that were dispersing out of Africa at the same time. One such location was 'Ubeidiya, on the southern shore of the Sea of Galilee, where some of the oldest hominin remains in Eurasia have been discovered, dating to between 1.2 million and 1.5 million years ago.

Several Stone Ages, when stone tools prevailed and make up the bulk of artifacts, are followed by periods when other technologies came into use. They lent their names to the different periods. The basic framework for the southern Levant is, as follows: Paleolithic or Old Stone Age is often divided up into phases called, from early-to-late: Lower Paleolithic, Middle Paleolithic and Upper Paleolithic. An Epipaleolithic (latest Paleolithic) period, also known as Mesolithic (transition to Neolithic) follows and is, in turn succeeded by a Neolithic (New Stone Age).

The following Chalcolithic period includes the first evidence of metallurgy with copper making its appearance. However, as stone technology remains prevalent, the name, Chalcolithic (Copper/Stone) age combines the two.

=== Bronze Age ===
Bronze is used for the following periods, but is actually a misnomer for a good part of that time. An Early Bronze Age is divided into three major phases, Early Bronze I, II and III, but copper and not bronze was the most common metal in use, while stone technology continued to contribute the bulk of tools. Early Bronze III is followed by another period, alternately named Early Bronze IV, Middle Bronze I, Intermediate Bronze or Early Bronze-Middle Bronze. In this period the name is apt; true bronze (a tin alloy of copper) makes its appearance in this time span.

The next period is generally known as Middle Bronze II and is generally broken down into two sub-periods, Middle Bronze IIa and Middle Bronze IIb. Some scholars acknowledge a Middle Bronze III. The next period is known as Late Bronze and is often sub-divided into Late Bronze I and II.

=== Iron Age ===
The introduction of iron, although relatively rare, especially in the earliest phases, caused the following phase to be named the Iron Age. It is variously sub-divided into Iron I, Iron II and sometimes Iron III, with subdivisions becoming increasingly popular as sequences become better known. Some archaeologists suggest that there in the transition from the Late Bronze Age to the Early Iron Age, the large cultural differences are explained by foreign invasion, that is, the introduction of new ethnicity. More recent evidence indicates that the large culture changes were not the result of a foreign invasion. Rather, the Iron Age people of the southern Levant were related to their Bronze Age predecessors.

=== Later historical periods ===
The post-Iron Age is generally thought of as historical and accordingly names of periods reflect this. The very latest Iron Age phase is sometimes called "Assyrian" and the following period is universally known as the Persian period.

The 333 BCE conquest of the region by Alexander the Great is accepted as the beginning of the Hellenistic period. The Deuterocanonical book 2 Maccabees records: "Apollonius the son of Tharseas, who at that time was governor of Celesyria and Phenicia", Celesyria being the transliteration of Coele-Syria. It is followed by the Roman period, with an Early and Late Roman sub-period. The 4th century is recognised as the beginning of the Byzantine period, that lasted until the Arab conquest of the region.

The following period is known as Early Arab and sub-periods by the names of reigning dynasties. The Crusader conquest of the region is known, appropriately as the Crusader period, which in part overlaps with Ayyubid rule, and it is followed by a Mamluk period after the conquering power. In 1516–17 the Ottoman Empire conquered the region and gave its name to the period that lasted until 1917–18, when the British conquered it in World War I.

== See also ==
- History of Palestine
- History of Israel
- Names of the Levant
- Natufian culture
- Northern Levant
- South Levantine Arabic
