= Nonferrous archaeometallurgy of the Southern Levant =

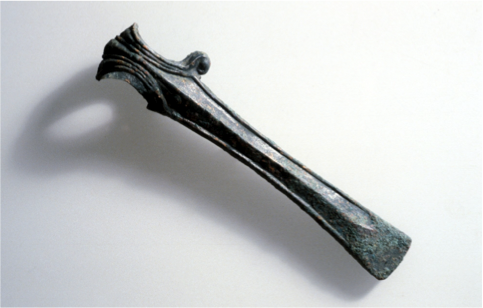
A battle axe from the Middle Bronze Age (MB) found in Tel Rumeida, West Bank

Nonferrous archaeometallurgy in the southern Levant is the archaeological study of non-iron-related metal technology in the region of the Southern Levant during the Chalcolithic period and Bronze Age from approximately 4500BC to 1000BC.

== Chalcolithic period ==
The first known use of metals in the Southern Levant is during the Chalcolithic period (end of 5th–most of the 4th millennium BCE). More than 500 metal objects were found, mainly in hoards, burials, and habitation remains. Most of the metals originate from sites in the southern part of Israel and Jordan; very rarely do they occur beyond the center of Israel and north of Wadi Qana. The metal findings from this period were separated into three groups; most of them belong to the following first two groups:

Prestige/cult-elaborated and complex-shaped objects made of copper (Cu) alloyed (a deliberate choice of complex minerals that could be reduced to a mixture of metals with specific recognizable and desirable properties, totally different from unalloyed copper) with distinct amounts of antimony (Sb) or nickel (Ni) and arsenic (As). They were cast using a “lost wax” technique into single closed clay moulds and then polished into their final shining gray or gold-like colors depending on the amount of antimony or nickel and arsenic in the copper. The Nahal Mishmar hoard was the biggest hoard (416 metal objects comprising mainly artistically complex-shaped objects), found hidden in a cave by Nahal Mishmar, Judean Desert, Israel.

They were wrapped in a straw mat (e.g., Shalev; Tadmor). Carbon-14 dating of the reed mat in which the objects were wrapped suggests that it dates to at least 3500 B.C.

The origin of the complex source material for the production of these objects is currently unknown. The nearest suitable ore is in Trans-Caucasus and Azerbaijan — more than 1500 km from the finding sites of the objects. Several clay and stone cores and clay mould remains were petrographically analyzed and the results point to a possible local production in the area of the Judean Desert, within the metals distribution zone in Israel, which is concentrated mainly in the southern part of the country: between Giv’at Oranit and Wadi Qana (east of modern Tel Aviv) in the north and the Be’er Sheva valley sites in the south. Currently, no production remains or production sites of these prestige/cult objects were found.

Unalloyed copper tools comprising mainly relatively thick- and short-bladed objects (axes, adzes, and chisels) and points (awls and/or drills) made from a smelted copper ore, cast into an open mould and then hammered and annealed into their final shape. The copper tools were produced in the Chalcolithic villages on the banks of the Be’er Sheva valley where slag fragments, clay crucibles, some possible furnace lining pieces, copper prills, and amorphous lumps were found, in addition to high-grade carbonate copper ore (cuprite). The ore was collected and selected in the area of Faynan in Trans-Jordan and transported to northern Negev villages some 150 km to the north, to be smelted for the local production of these copper objects.

A third group of eight gold (Au) and electrum (Au + up to 30% Ag) solid rings was found in Wadi Qanah cave. This unique find, with no dated parallels, is attributed by the excavators to the Chalcolithic period based on local stratigraphic and geological evidence and 14C dating of ground samples from the vicinity of the finds in the cave. Surface analyses of these objects revealed a surface gold enrichment caused by the depletion of silver and the copper traces. This effect could be caused naturally by deposition but could have been achieved intentionally at the time of production in order to achieve a yellow color for the electrum rings rich in silver, as well. During the Chalcolithic (copper and stone) era at least two, if not three distinct industries of different metals were operating and their products were found in the Southern Levant.

== Early Bronze Age ==
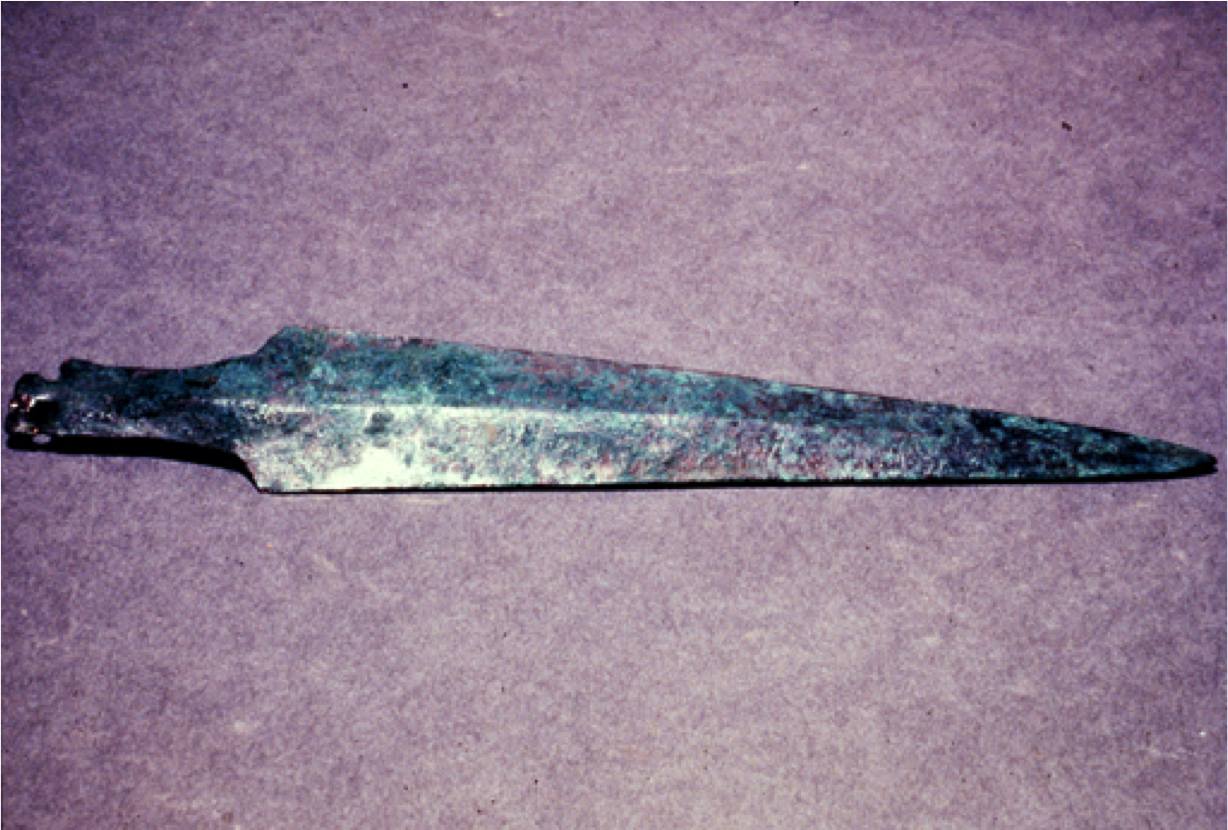
An Early Bronze Age dagger found in Afridar, Israel

During the next thousand years of the Early Bronze Age (end of 4th–end of 3rd millennium BCE) the same unalloyed copper production of the Chalcolithic (group 2, above) continued for the production of short blades and points. The same metal technique was used for the novel production of long blade weapons (riveted daggers and knives, heavy tanged swords, and epsilon-shaped axes). The same copper production technique of casting into an open mould and then hammering and annealing, was used to produce all other metals as well, including jewelry of thin plates, sometimes decorated, and elongated thin wires (mainly for rings and bracelets) made of unalloyed copper as well as from silver (first appearance) and gold.

Archaeological remains of Early Bronze copper mining and copper smelting in the vicinity of the mines were found in Trans-Jordan (Feinan), the Arava Valley (Timnah), and southern Sinai. The only production remains of metal are those of copper and include copper slag, prills, and amorphous copper lumps and small shallow ball-shaped clay crucibles with a socket. In the Early Bronze I site of the Ashkelon Marina, in the southern part of the Israeli coast, small shallow open pits, probably for the melting of copper in a crucible, were found next to copper industrial remains.

All pits showed a similar structure of a red soil burnt layer covered within by a white thin layer of calcite. No archaeological material was found associated with these man-made rudimentary remains. In the vicinity, and detached from the installations, scattered remains of pottery sherds, bone fragments, copper slag remains, and some pieces of clay crucibles were found. They were dated to Early Bronze Age I. Optically stimulated luminescence (OSL) ages of the fill of the pits and thermoluminescence (TL) ages of quartz grains extracted from the hardened red layer of the pits showed that the last burning activity was conducted during the same period: 5260 ± 380 years ago (OSL) and 5180 ± 380 years ago (TL).

Most of the metal products are found in burials, and are mainly from the Early Bronze I. The same types of metals continue in sites and tombs throughout the entire Early Bronze and all over the local distribution map of Early Bronze sites in Israel, from the Upper Galilee in the north to Ein Besor and Tel Malhata in the northern Negev. A single hoard of copper objects probably from the Early Bronze I was found with no related archaeological context in the fields of Kfar Monash.

During the Early Bronze period the Southern Levant's metal industry became more specialized and organized in separated places for the different parts of production, and the products became more homogenous, as did the different materials and modes of production. For the first time in the Southern Levant's metal history, significant typological and technological affiliations to the growing metal industries in the two major imperial centers (Egypt and Mesopotamia) on both sides of the “Fertile Crescent” were visible. During all the Early Bronze Age there is no archaeometallurgical evidence for bronze production and no bronze objects were found during this period in the Southern Levant as opposed to unalloyed copper.

== Middle Bronze Age ==
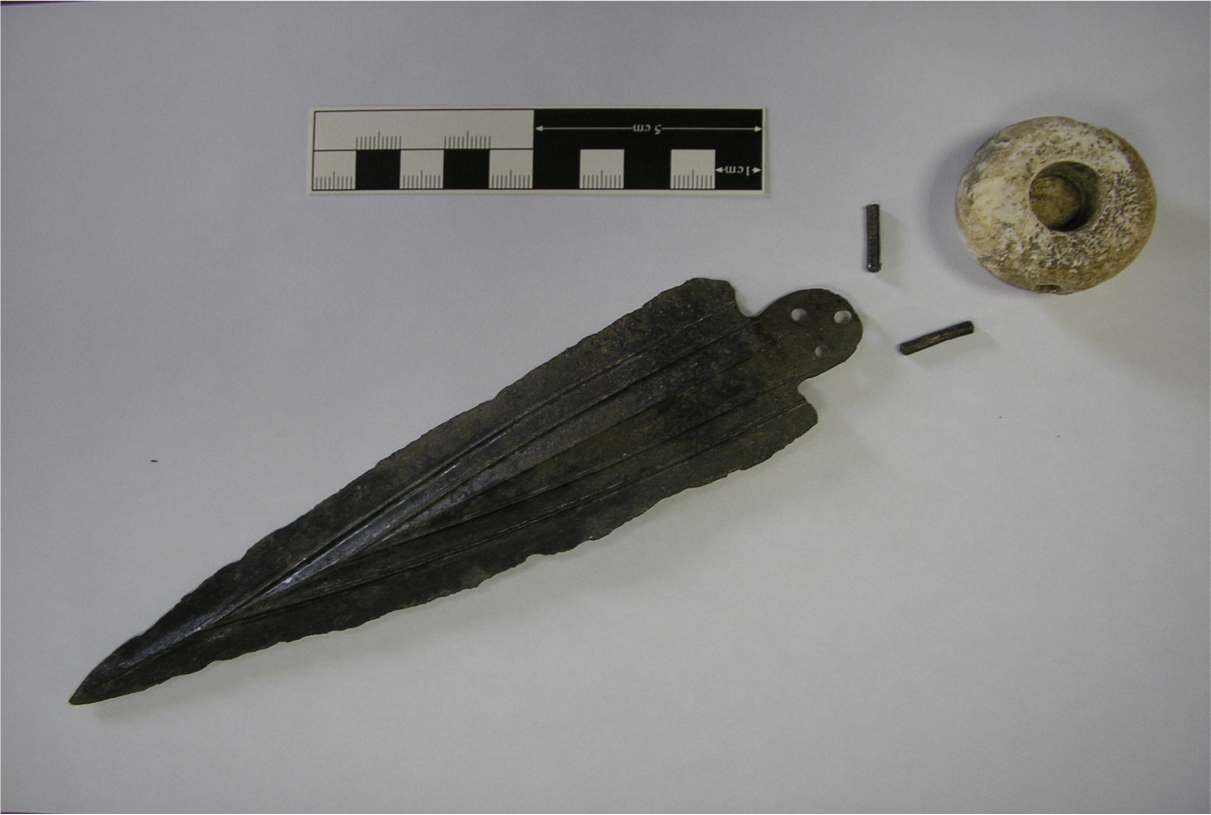
A Middle Bronze Age ribbed dagger found in Rishon le-Zion, Israel

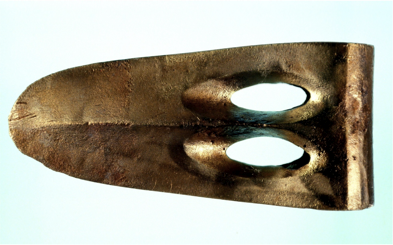
A duckbill axe from the Middle Bronze Age (MB) found in Kabri, Israel

In the Middle Bronze (MB) Age (end of 3rd–middle of 2nd millennium BCE) hundreds of metal objects were found. The development of more complex weapons (longer daggers, swords, complex battle axes, etc.) was possible by alloying the copper with arsenic or with tin. All the MBII weapons that were analyzed were made of copper alloyed either with tin (14%–2% Sn) or with arsenic (4.3%–0.5% As), sometimes with a mixture of both usually in low concentrations. These changes in the metal properties of weapons are also reflected in the composition of small objects, like toggle pins that were probably made mainly from re-melting of scrap. Lead (Pb) started to play a greater role as a major alloy for thick casts of copper-based objects, mainly of battle axes during this period.

Although two definite major alloying compositions for the production of MBII copper-based artifacts, (1)copper with arsenic and (2) copper with tin, are detected, to date no visible connection of specific alloy with specific type of object or different periods has been seen: both alloys appear in similar objects and in burials dated to the beginning as well as to later parts of the ca. 400 years of the MBII age. Currently, there is no visible correlation between any specific alloying tradition and the spatial distribution of finds, as well. Similar objects made of arsenical coppers and of tin bronze were found in the same geographic region and identical objects with similar metal composition were found in distant areas like Palestine and Upper Egypt. The difference in the overall alloying pattern curve in Jericho and in Tell El-Dab'a shown by Philip (1995) does not necessarily have to be related to two different production centers, but could as well be the result of comparing different groups of objects (i.e., more prestigious weapons of control alloying either with tin or with arsenic) at Tell El Dab’a and similar objects mixed with simpler copper-based ones (like simple daggers, knives, toggle pins, etc.) in Jericho and/or types like the spearheads that have more mixed, low levels of both alloys.

The examination of metal composition in the formation of different types does add knowledge concerning production modes. The thicker the object is, the more lead was deliberately added to the cast. The highest amounts of lead were measured in the duckbill axes, less in the flat socketed axes, and much less in thinner blades like spears and daggers, which were much more worked and annealed after being cast. This observation corresponds well with the controlled alloying of the duckbill axes and ribbed daggers (with much less lead in the latter) from the MBIIa, but does not correspond with the spears. Although they are derived mainly from MBIIa contexts, their composition is less controlled and more varied. There might be a connection between the level of allowing control and the investment in the cast — the more complex types, like duckbill and flat socketed axes and ribbed daggers, are usually cast in steatite, two-piece closed and well-carved moulds. On the other hand, some of the less controlled alloyed types, like spearheads and knives as well as more simple tools such as chisel points, were mainly cast into open, relatively roughly carved limestone moulds.

== Late Bronze Age ==
Hundreds of metal artefacts were found from the Late Bronze Age (second half of 2nd millennium BCE): ca. 200 blade weapons, 140 metal vessels, some working tools, small arrowheads, and decorative objects. All the blades analyzed were made of tin bronze and most of all the other copper-based objects are either tin bronze alloy or have tin in their metal as impurity.

At this stage, large quantities of copper and tin ingots (i.e., 10 tons of Cu and 3 tons of Sn ingots in one cargo of Uluburun shipwreck from the 14th century BCE) were found all over the coasts of the Mediterranean and in several shipwrecks under the sea, mainly off the southern coast of Turkey. In Canaan at that time, Cypriot, Egyptian, Syrian, and Mesopotamian types of bronze objects were found, besides the local Canaanite metal collection. These were all basically made of tin bronze. The “prestige” objects like sickle blade swords or cast-hilt daggers were alloyed with highquality (11–13% by weight) Sn, whereas the simpler and probably less expensive objects had lower levels of tin in the metal.

== Iron Age ==
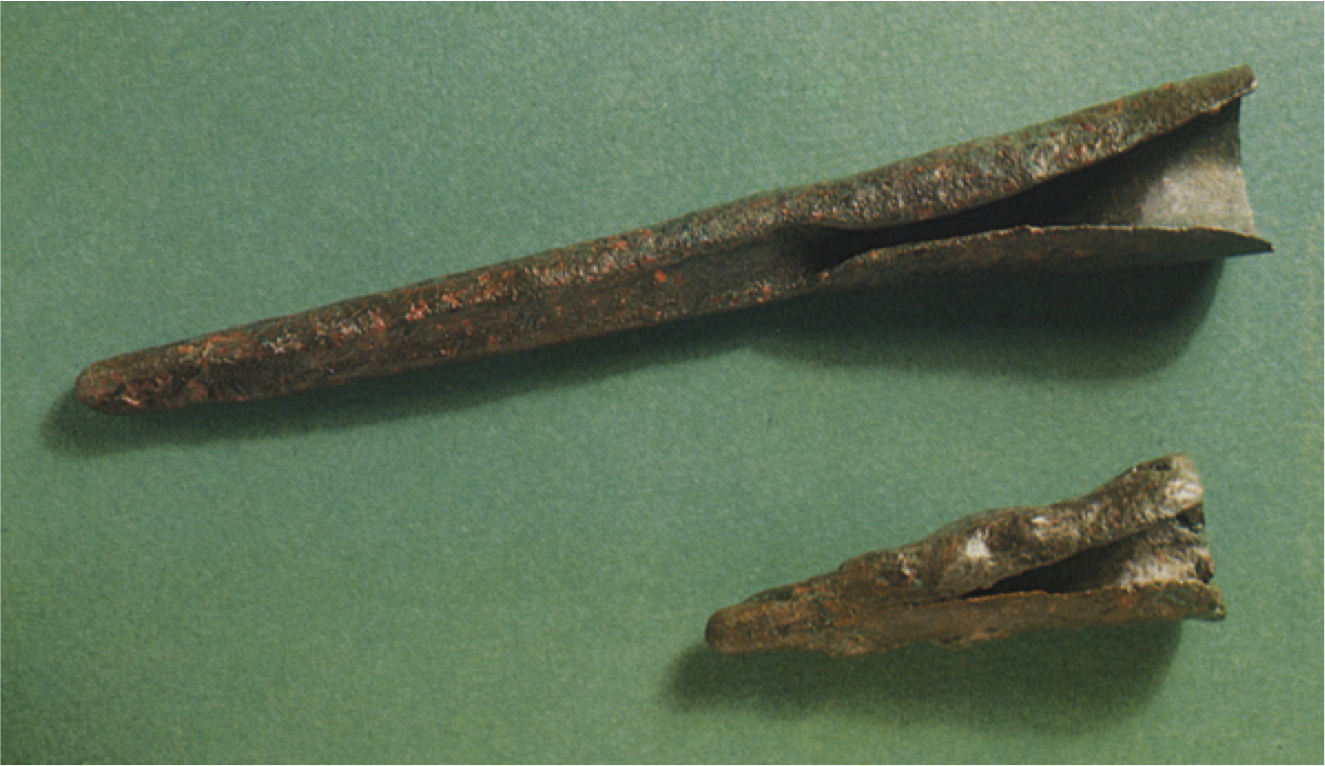
Iron point dated to the Iron Age, found in Tel Dan, Israel

Copper and copper-based metals continued to be the major metal in use during the first part of the Iron Age (end of 2nd–beginning of 1st millennium BCE). Bronze scrap re-melting continued (mainly v-shaped clay crucibles, slags, clay tuyères) and structures of open campfires full of metal production remains were found in several sites in Israel associated mainly with the Philistines and the Sea People settlements on the northern Sharon coast between modern Tel Aviv and Haifa, e.g., Tel Qasile, Tel Gerisa, Tel Dor, and Tel Dan, in northern Israel. Only later in the Iron Age did metallic iron start to play a major role as a base metal for tools and weapons.

XRF analyses of metals, metallurgical remains, and FTIR + XRF analyses of archaeological sediments from the open industrial area G in Tel Dor enabled the identification of the exact locations of metal working during the end of the Late Bronze Age and the Iron Age. It was also possible to partially reconstruct the pyrotechnological events that probably involved re-melting bronze in an open fireplace. Even after thousands of years the ash, charcoal, calcite, and burnt ground in the immediate vicinity of the metal work area retained significantly higher values of copper (circa 0.05 wt% Cu) than the surrounding archaeological layers.

During Iron Age II and III and the Persian Period (the first half of the first millennium BCE), copper-based objects continued to be present beside growing numbers of iron products. Silver hoards containing small tongueshaped bar chunks or scrapped jewellery became more and more common in the archaeological context in Israel as well as all over the Mediterranean. A similar phenomenon was evident during the Persian Period on the coast of Israel, where copper and copper-based objects were found in relatively large quantities and with parallels in other sites all around the Mediterranean Sea. What could be defined as a basic Phoenician metal “kit” is composed mainly of the “Irano–Scythian” shape of three winged and socketed arrowheads made mainly of tin bronze, sometimes with arsenic and/or lead and left as-cast, and “hand”-like decorated fibulae made of good quality (7 wt%–12 wt% Sn) tin bronze and lead (up to 17 wt% Pb). They underwent mechanical treatment after casting and an extensive final cold working in the area where the needle spring was fastened into the fibulae body. Long unalloyed copper nails that were found in coastal sites as well as part of the structure of ships were found in the shipwreck from Ma’agan Mikhael.
