= Liquation =

Method for separating metals from an ore or alloy

Liquation is a metallurgical method for separating metals from an ore or alloy. The material must be heated until one of the metals starts to melt and drain away from the other and can be collected. This method was largely used to remove lead containing silver from copper, but it can also be used to remove antimony from ore minerals, and refine tin.

The 16th-century process of separating copper and silver using liquation, described by Georg Agricola in his 1556 treatise De re metallica, remained almost unchanged until the 19th century when it was replaced by cheaper and more efficient processes such as sulphatization and eventually electrolytic methods.

== History ==
The first known use of liquation on a large scale was in Germany in the mid-15th century. Metal workers had long known that Central European copper ore was rich in silver, so it was only a matter of time until a method was discovered that could separate the two metals.

Liquation is first documented in the archives of the municipal foundry in Nuremberg in 1453. Nuremberg was one of Germany's main centres of metal refining and fabrication, and was a leader in metallurgical techniques. Five liquation plants soon sprang up around the city, and within 15 years had spread throughout Germany, Poland and the Italian Alps.

This is often regarded as the beginning of liquation, but evidence suggests liquation may have existed in smaller-scale use centuries earlier. The sophisticated nature of the 15th century liquation plants with custom-made furnaces would be surprising for a new technology. There was also a far simpler but more labour-intensive version of the method brought to Japan by the Portuguese in 1591; this is possibly the remnants of an earlier European method.

Agricola discusses various types of copper produced from the liquation process; one of these is caldarium or ‘cauldron copper’ which contains a high level of lead and was used to make medieval cauldrons. Analysis of 13th century cauldrons shows that they are made out of copper with a low level of silver and high levels of lead which would match that produced by liquation.

Liquation may even have existed as early as the 12th century; in Theophilus’ On Divers Arts he makes a possible reference to liquation. However, he was not an expert in metallurgy, so his writings may not be accurate, and though there were similar cauldrons in the 12th century, no compositional analysis has been published that supports this theory.

Against the idea that this process was used significantly before it became widespread in the mid-15th century, is the fact that it had to be done on a large-scale to be financially viable. There is no evidence of large-scale liquation before Nuremberg. Also, efficient liquation requires an extremely skilled practitioner. Anyone with that much skill is unlikely to spend much time on something unprofitable.

Some suggest liquation existed even earlier. Babylonian texts from Mari mention that ‘mountain copper’ was ‘washed’ to produce ‘washed copper’ and that lead was used with silver to produce ‘washed silver’. Some say this shows liquation was being carried out in the Near East as early as the second millennium BC. Crucially, however, these texts do not specifically mention lead being used with copper to produce silver, as would be expected for liquation.

== Process ==
Liquation requires that the silver-rich copper first be melted with approximately three times its weight in lead; as silver has a greater affinity with lead, most of the silver would end up within this rather than the copper. If the copper is assayed and found to contain too little silver for liquation to be financially viable (around 0.31% is the minimum required,) it is melted and allowed to settle so that much of the silver sinks towards the bottom. The ‘tops’ are then drawn off and used to produce copper while the silver-rich ‘bottoms’ are used in the liquation process. The copper-lead alloy created can be tapped off and cast into large plano-convex ingots known as ‘liquation cakes’. As the metals cool and solidify the copper and the silver-containing lead separate as they are immiscible with each other.

The ratio of lead to copper in these cakes is an important factor for the process to work efficiently. Agricola recommended 3 parts copper to 8–12 parts lead. The copper must be assayed to accurately determine how much silver it contains; for copper rich in silver the top end of this ratio was used to make sure the maximum amount of silver possible would end up within the lead. However, there also needs to be enough copper to allow the cakes to keep their shape once most of the lead has drained away; too much copper and it would trap some of the lead within and the process would be very inefficient.

The size of these cakes remained consistent from when Agricola wrote of them in 1556 to the 19th century when the process became obsolete. They were usually 2 1/2 to 3 1/2 inches (6.4 to 8.9 cm) thick, about 2 feet (0.61 m) in diameter and weighed from 225 to 375 lb (102 to 170 kg). This consistency is not without reason as the size of the cakes is very important to the smooth running of the liquation process. If the cakes are too small, the product would not be worth the time and costs spent on the process, if they are too large then the copper would begin to melt before the maximum amount of lead has drained away.

The cakes are heated in a liquation furnace, usually four or five at once, to a temperature above the melting point of lead (327°C), but below that of copper (1084 °C), so that the silver-rich lead melts and flows away. As the melting point of lead is so low a high-temperature furnace is not required and it can be fuelled with wood. It is important that this takes place in a reducing atmosphere, i.e. one with little oxygen, to avoid the lead oxidising; the cakes are therefore well covered by charcoal and little air is allowed into the furnace. It is impossible to stop some of the lead oxidising, however, and this drops down and forms spiky projections known as ‘liquation thorns’ in the channel underneath the hearth.

The older and relatively simple method of cupellation can then be used to separate the silver from the lead. If the lead is assayed and found not to contain enough silver to make the cupellation process worthwhile it is reused in liquation cakes until it has sufficient silver.

The ‘exhausted liquation cakes’ which still contain some lead and silver are ‘dried’ in a special furnace which is heated to a higher temperature under oxidising conditions. This is essentially just another stage of liquation and most of the remaining lead is expelled and oxidised to form liquation thorns, though some remains as lead metal. The copper can then be refined to remove other impurities and produce copper metal.

Waste products can be reused to produce new liquation cakes to try to minimise loss of metals, especially silver. The waste products are mostly in the form of liquation thorns from the liquation and the drying process but there are also some slags produced.

== Efficiency ==
This process is not 100% efficient. At the Lautenthal, Altenau, and Sankt Andreasberg smelting-works in the Upper Harz between 1857 and 1860 25% of the silver, 25.1% of the lead and 9.3% of the copper was lost. Some of this is lost in slag that is not worth reusing, some is lost by what is termed ‘burning’, and some of the silver is lost to the refined copper. It is clear therefore that a constant supply of lead was needed to make up for that lost at various stages.

== Importance ==
John U. Nef, an expert on Renaissance economics, described liquation as ‘even more important than the invention of the printing press’ for the development of industry during this period. It increased production of silver on a massive scale. Between 1460 and 1530, the output of silver increased as much as fivefold in central Europe. This had a secondary effect of lowering the costs of producing copper at a time when its demand had increased due to the needs of the brassmaking industry, and the use of copper on ships and roofs. Lead production also received a boost, indeed the lack of lead available held the liquation process back until a large lead-bearing seam was discovered at Tarnowitz in Poland.

Liquation triggered an increase in mining operations, and a new class of wealthy merchants clamoured to participate. Some of the wealthiest merchants in Europe invested in mining, including the French Royal Banker Jacques Coeur and the powerful Medici family of Florence. However, most of the funds came from merchants in neighbouring towns. For example, the burghers of Nuremberg funded mines in the mountains of Bohemia and the Harz.

Many new copper and silver mines sprang up. A mine at Jáchymov (Joachimstal) in the Ore Mountains was so successful that a coin called 'tolar' was created, which led to the term, dollar. Others of note included Schneeberg, and Annaberg (also in the Ore Mountains), Schwaz, in the valley of the Inn, and at Neusohl in Hungary. The new mining wealth allowed some of the largest mines of previous centuries to reopen, such as the silver-bearing lead and copper mines of Rammelsberg. These old mines had previously been abandoned due to flooding, collapses, lack of technology, or simply a lack of money. Now shafts could be sunk deeper and water more efficiently drained, so miners could work seams once out of reach.

Liquation-based wealth helped build roads between mining and processing regions, and financed improvements to mining technology. Thus its influence went beyond just increasing silver and copper production. It helped revive the economy of large parts of Europe, and the mining of other metals such as iron and mercury.
